= Camps for soldiers of the UNR Army interned in Poland (1919–1924) =

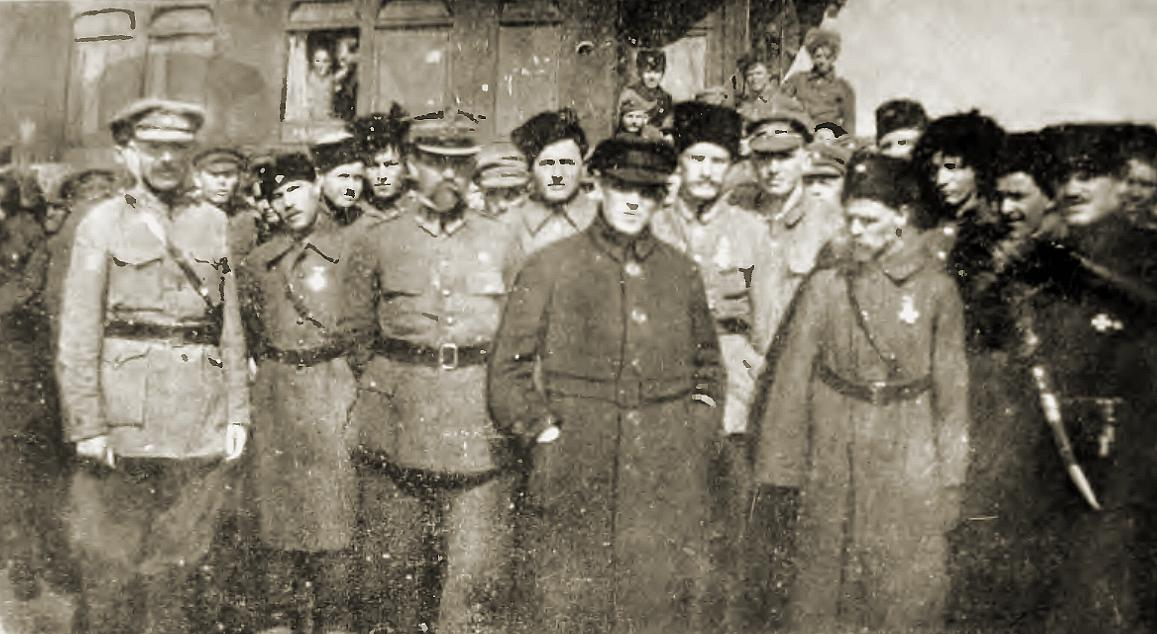
Symon Petlura visiting a camp in Wadowice, 9th April 1921.

Combatants of the Ukrainian People's Republic (UNR) Army were interned in Poland initially at the end of 1919 (after the breakdown of Ukrainian front) in Łańcut immediately after they organized six Rifle divisions.

== Background ==
Although the West Ukrainian People's Republic (ZUNR) and the Polish POW Affairs Commission had signed the Lviv Agreement on prisoners of war in February 1919, the subsequent defeat of ZUNR meant its validity was unclear.

== Internment camps ==
After the defeat of the UNR Army at the end of 1920 and its crossing over to Polish territory, about 20,000 soldiers were placed in a number of Internment camps, the most important were in Łańcut, Aleksandrów Kujawski and Kalisz (Wadowice and Piotrków). In mid 1921, the internees were transferred from Łańcut to Strzałkowo and at the end of 1921 from Aleksandrów to Szczypiorno, as well as to neighbouring Kalisz. The internment camps remained until their final liquidation in the middle of 1924.

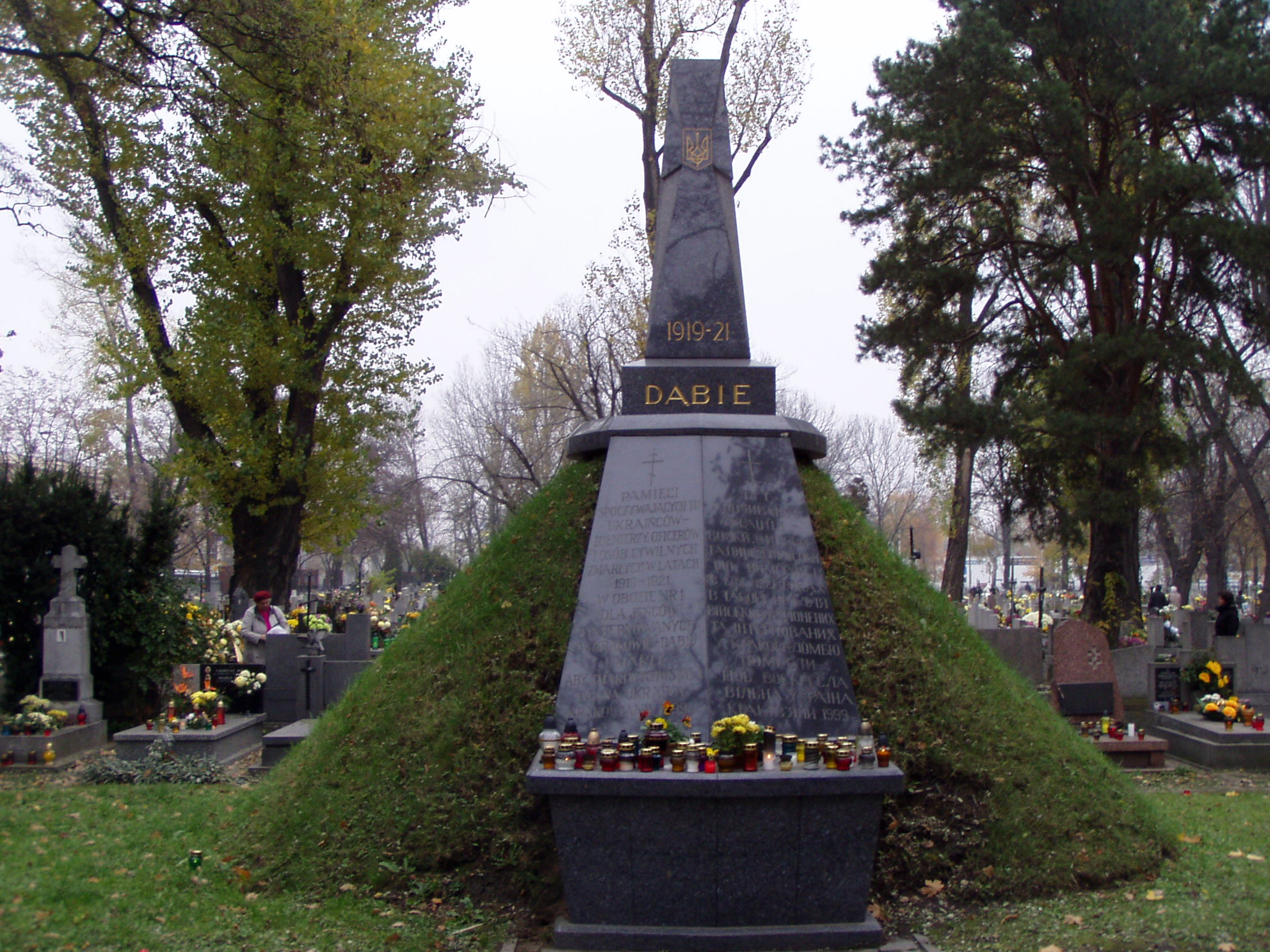
Monument to the deceased soldiers of the UNR at the Rakowicki Cemetery.

Active cultural and educational life developed within the camps – courses for the illiterate and other (especially professional), various schools (i. a. a high school in Kalisz), a folk university at Łańcut and Strzałkowo, galleries, theatrical groups, and other educational and cultural organizations –, and publications exposed artistic as well as religious life.

The leader of camps of internees (it was in the Ukrainian hands and related to the UNR government in exile) cared about the theoretical military teaching and increased the petty officer personnel. The camps of internees in Kalisz and Szczypiorno were after Warsaw the second cell of life of Ukrainian emigration in Poland. The number of soldiers in internment camps diminished constantly: with departure to Czechoslovakia, in particular for university, to France for labour and similar. After liquidation of internment camps, the former soldiers passed to a status of political emigrants in Poland.

== See also ==
- Camps for Russian prisoners and internees in Poland (1919–1924)
