= Skąpe =

Skąpe may refer to the following places:

- Skąpe, Greater Poland Voivodeship (west-central Poland)
- Skąpe, Kuyavian-Pomeranian Voivodeship (north-central Poland)
- Skąpe, Świętokrzyskie Voivodeship (south-central Poland)
- Skąpe, Lubusz Voivodeship (west Poland)
- Skąpe, West Pomeranian Voivodeship (north-west Poland)
