= Radłowo =

Radłowo may refer to the following places:

- Radłowo, Greater Poland Voivodeship (west-central Poland)
- Radłowo, Kuyavian-Pomeranian Voivodeship (north-central Poland)
- Radłowo, West Pomeranian Voivodeship (north-west Poland)
