= John of Głogów Bench =

Sculpture in Głogów, Poland

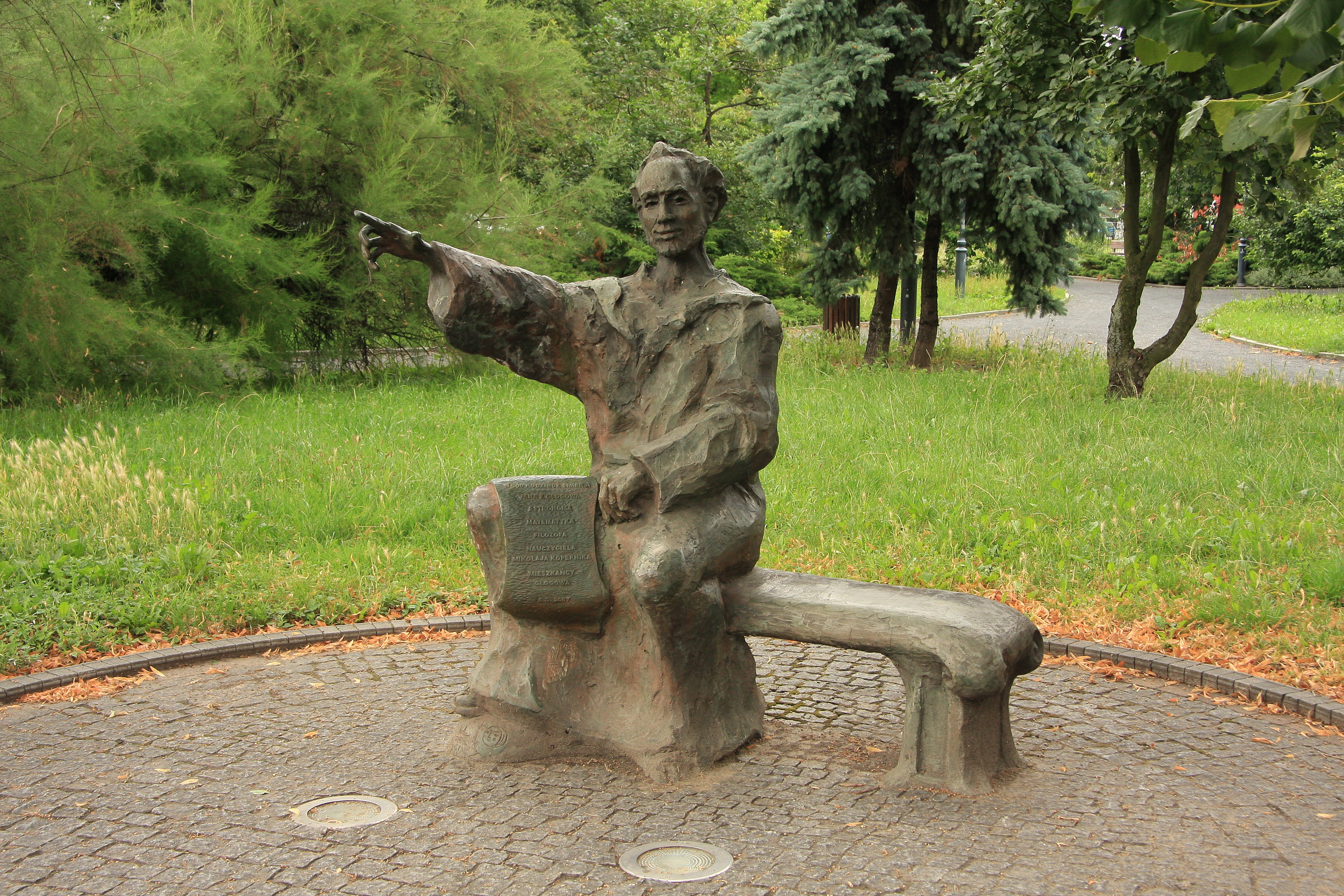
- The sculpture in 2007.
- Interactive map of John of Głogów Bench
- Location: John of Głogów Square, Głogów, Poland
- Coordinates: 51°39′56″N 16°05′10″E
- Type: Statue
- Material: Synthetic resin
- Opening date: 2007
- Dedicated to: John of Głogów

The John of Głogów Bench (Polish: Ławeczka Jana z Głogowa) is a sculpture in Głogów, Poland, placed at the John of Głogów Square next to the Wolności Avenue. it is dedicated to John of Głogów, a 15th-century astronomer, mathematician, and philosopher, and teacher of scientist Nicholas Copernicus. It was unveiled in 2007.

== History ==
The sculpture was financed by the city of Głogów, and unveiled in 2007. Made from a synthetic resin, it proved to not be durable, and prone to vandalism.

== Design ==
The sculpture is made from a synthetic resin with interior structure with metal rods. It depicts John of Głogów siting on a bench, pointing with his right hand froward. A scroll lies on his leg, bearing a Polish inscription which reads "W 500 rocznicę śmierci Jana z Głogowa, astronoma, matematyka, nauczyciela Mikołaja Kopernika; mieszkańcy Głogowa, A.D. 2007" and translates to "In the 500th anniversary of death of John of Głogów, an astronomer, mathematian, philosopher, teacher of Nicholas Copernicus; the residents of Głogów, AD 2007".
