= Unia (disambiguation) =

Unia is an album by Sonata Arctica.

Unia may also refer to:

- Unia, Greater Poland Voivodeship, a village in west-central Poland
- Unia (union) a Swiss trade union
- UNIA, short for the Universal Negro Improvement Association and African Communities League
- Unia or Uniates, a name given to the Eastern Catholic Churches
- UNIA, short of the International University of Andalucía, a Spanish public University in Andalusia
- Unia, the Belgian Centre for Equal Opportunities
