= Chwałkowice =

Chwałkowice may refer to the following places in Poland:

- Chwałkowice, Lower Silesian Voivodeship (south-west Poland)
- Chwałkowice, Greater Poland Voivodeship (west-central Poland)
