= Witold Hulewicz =

Polish poet, literary critic, translator and publisher

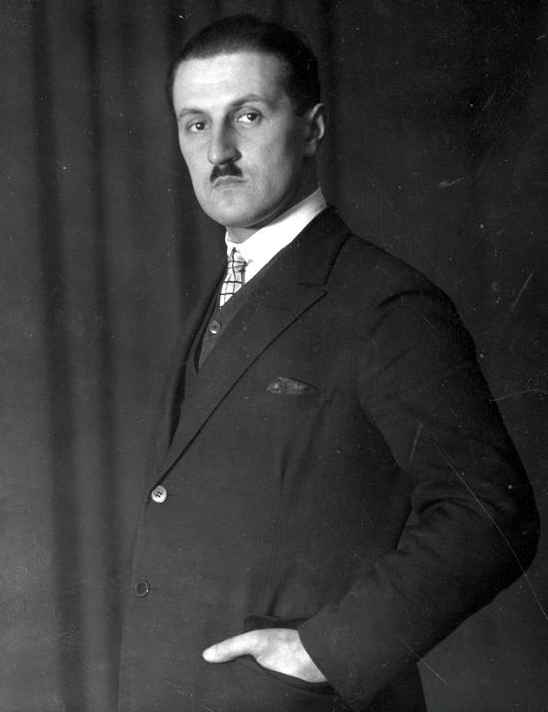
Witold Hulewicz in 1928, portrait by Jan Bułhak

Witold Hulewicz (1895–1941) was a Polish poet, literary critic, translator and publisher. Best known for his translations of German language literature, including most of the published works of his personal friend Rainer Maria Rilke, Hulewicz was also one of the pioneers of radio in Poland: he was the first director of the Wilno-based Polish Radio Wilno, one of the most popular Polish radio stations of the 1920s and 1930s. He also published numerous literary and artistic journals. Arrested by the Germans during World War II as part of their AB-Aktion, Witold Hulewicz was murdered at Palmiry in 1941.

== Biography ==
Witold Hulewicz was born on 26 November 1895 in Kościanki near Słupca, to a wealthy landowner family of Greater Poland. Two of his six siblings also became artists and writers: Jerzy and Bohdan. Early in his youth Witold Hulewicz moved to Poznań, where he started his studies at a local Humanist Faculty. During World War I he was drafted into the German Army and sent to the Western Front. He returned to Poznań in 1918 to continue his studies, but instead joined the ranks of the Polish Army and took part in the Greater Poland Uprising. As the organiser and commander of the 1st Signals Company he ended the campaign in the rank of Captain. Hulewicz then resumed his studies, first at the local Poznań University and then at Sorbonne in Paris.

He lived in Poznań, later, in Wilno and Warsaw. He founded a literary magazine, Zdrój, and worked with the Polish Radio. In 1934, Hulewicz participated in a highly-publicized duel against Stanisław Mackiewicz, which was caused by the publication of caricatures of Hulewicz in the Vilnius Słowo newspaper whose editor-in-chief was Mackiewicz. The duel ended inconclusive as both were wounded.

During the occupation of Poland he was the chief editor of the underground magazine Polska żyje. He was arrested by the Germans in 1940 and executed the following year.

In 1995 the Association of Polish Literates created an award named after him.

His work was the inspiration to several movies, including The Scar.
