= Dutch Connor =

American football player and sports coach (1895–1978)

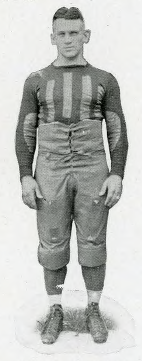
- Connor c. 1921, from the annual college yearbook of New Hampshire College

Biographical details
- Born: April 16, 1895; Skarboszewo, Poland
- Died: November 24, 1978 (aged 83); Alamo Heights, Texas, U.S.

Playing career

Football
- 1918–1921: New Hampshire
- 1925: Providence Steam Roller
- 1926: Brooklyn Lions
- Position: Back

Coaching career (HC unless noted)

Football
- 1927–1930: NYU (assistant)
- 1931: Norwich

Basketball
- 1935–1936: Brooklyn

Head coaching record
- Overall: 1–6 (football); 18–9 (basketball)

Stafford Joseph "Dutch" Connor (April 16, 1895 – November 24, 1978) was an American football player and coach of football and basketball. He played professionally in the National Football League (NFL) with the Providence Steam Roller in 1925 and the Brooklyn Lions in 1926. Connor served as the head football coach at Norwich University from in 1931. He was also the head men's basketball coach at Brooklyn College during the 1935–36 season.

Prior to his professional career, Connor played college football at New Hampshire College of Agriculture and the Mechanic Arts in Durham, New Hampshire, for the 1918 through 1921 seasons. The school became the University of New Hampshire in 1923, with its football team later known as the New Hampshire Wildcats. Connor was captain of the 1921 team. He was an inaugural member of the UNH Wildcats Hall of Fame in 1982.

During World War II, Connor served in the United States Navy from February 1943 through November 1945. Before enlisting in the Navy, he was a teacher at Spaulding High School in Rochester, New Hampshire.
