= Virdung =

Virdung is a surname. Notable people with the surname include:

- Johannes Virdung (1463–1538/39), German astrologer
- Sebastian Virdung, German composer
