= Chwalibogowo, Słupca County =

Chwalibogowo
- Village
- Location within Poland
- Coordinates: 52°16′N 17°48′E
- Country: Poland
- Voivodeship: Greater Poland
- County: Słupca
- Gmina: Strzałkowo

Chwalibogowo (German 1939-1945 Lobau) [xfalibɔˈɡɔvɔ] is a village in the administrative district of Gmina Strzałkowo, within Słupca County, Greater Poland Voivodeship, in west-central Poland.
