= Góry, Słupca County =

Góry
- Village
- Location within Poland
- Coordinates: 52°22′5″N 17°44′56″E
- Country: Poland
- Voivodeship: Greater Poland
- County: Słupca
- Gmina: Strzałkowo
- Population: 100

Góry [ˈɡurɨ] is a village in the administrative district of Gmina Strzałkowo, within Słupca County, Greater Poland Voivodeship, in west-central Poland.
