= Szemborowo =

- Village
- Location within Poland
- Coordinates: 52°22′N 17°43′E
- Country: Poland
- Voivodeship: Greater Poland
- County: Słupca
- Gmina: Strzałkowo
- Population: 354

Szemborowo [ʂɛmbɔˈrɔvɔ] is a village in the administrative district of Gmina Strzałkowo, within Słupca County, Greater Poland Voivodeship, in west-central Poland.
