= Ciosna, Greater Poland Voivodeship =

Ciosna
- Village
- Location within Poland
- Coordinates: 52°20′49″N 17°53′23″E
- Country: Poland
- Voivodeship: Greater Poland
- County: Słupca
- Gmina: Strzałkowo
- Population: 70

Ciosna [ˈt͡ɕɔsna] is a village in the administrative district of Gmina Strzałkowo, within Słupca County, Greater Poland Voivodeship, in west-central Poland.
