= Gmina Strzałkowo =

Gmina Strzałkowo Strzałkowo Commune
- Gmina
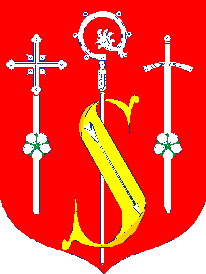
- Coat of arms
- Interactive map of Gmina Strzałkowo
- Coordinates (Strzałkowo): 52°18′36″N 17°49′5″E
- Country: Poland
- Voivodeship: Greater Poland
- County: Słupca
- Seat: Strzałkowo

Area
  - Total: 142.39 km^{2} (54.98 sq mi)

Population (2006)
  - Total: 9,617
  - Density: 67.54/km^{2} (174.9/sq mi)
- Website: https://www.strzalkowo.pl

Gmina Strzałkowo is a rural gmina (administrative district) in Słupca County, Greater Poland Voivodeship, in west-central Poland. Its seat is the village of Strzałkowo, which lies approximately 4 kilometres (2 mi) west of Słupca and 63 km (39 mi) east of the regional capital Poznań.

The gmina covers an area of 142.39 square kilometres (55.0 sq mi), and as of 2006 its total population is 9,617.

== Villages ==
Gmina Strzałkowo contains the villages and settlements of Babin, Babin-Olędry, Bielawy, Brudzewo, Chwalibogowo, Chwałkowice, Ciosna, Gonice Drugie, Góry, Graboszewo, Janowo, Janowo-Cegielnia, Janowo-Olędry, Katarzynowo, Kokczyn Drugi, Kokczyn Pierwszy, Kornaty, Kościanki, Krępkowo, Łężec, Młodziejewice, Ostrowo Kościelne, Paruszewo, Podkornaty, Pospólno, Radłowo, Radłowo Leśne, Rudy, Sierakowo, Skąpe, Skarboszewo, Słomczyce, Staw, Staw II, Strzałkowo, Szemborowo, Unia, Uścięcin and Wólka.

== Neighbouring gminas ==
Gmina Strzałkowo is bordered by the town of Słupca and by the gminas of Kołaczkowo, Powidz, Słupca, Witkowo and Września.
