= Ostrowo Kościelne =

- Village
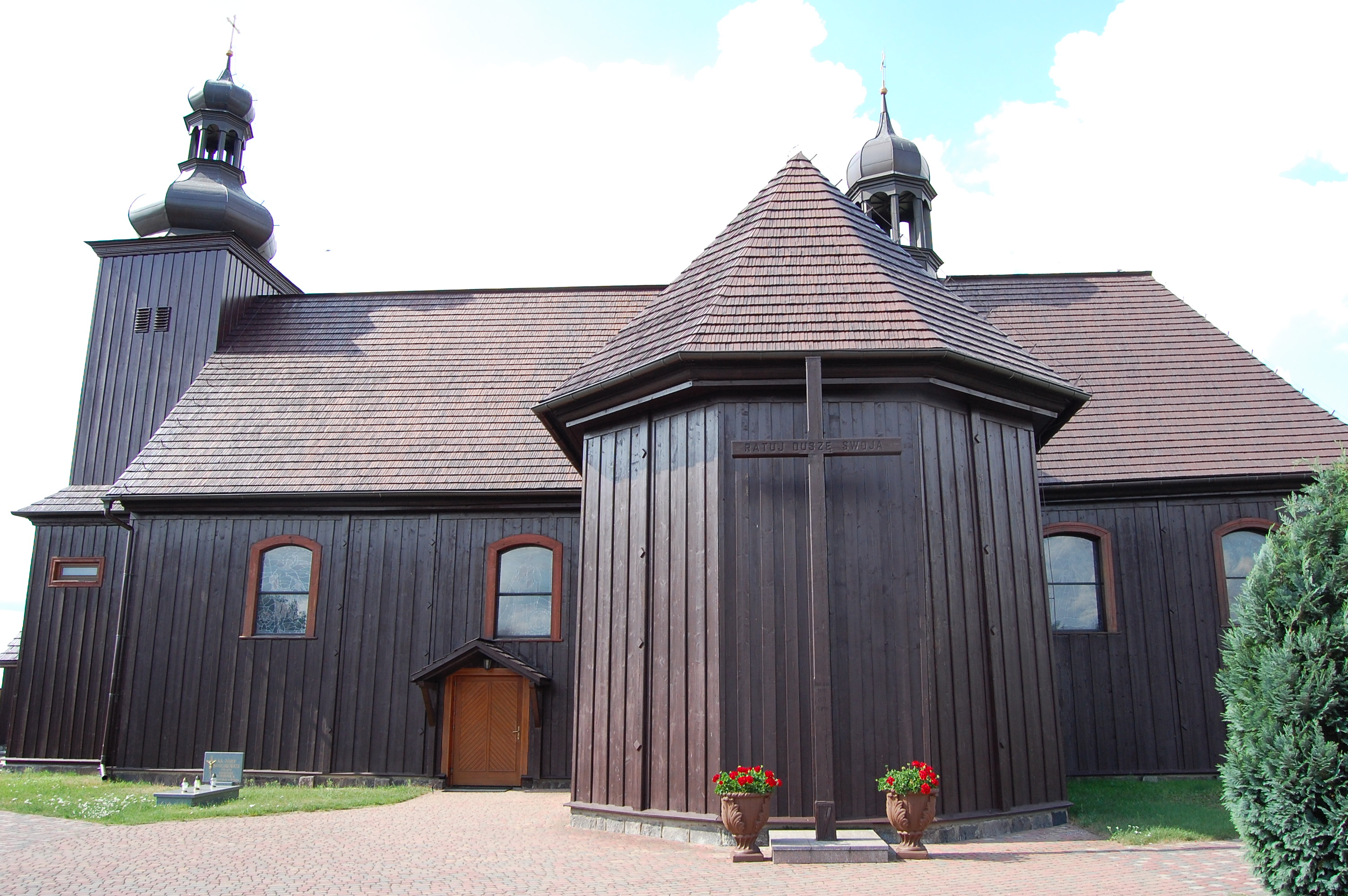
- Church of the Visitation of the Holy Virgin Mary

- Location within Poland
- Coordinates: 52°20′56″N 17°50′14″E
- Country: Poland
- Voivodeship: Greater Poland
- County: Słupca
- Gmina: Strzałkowo

Population
  - Total: 174

Ostrowo Kościelne [ɔsˈtrɔvɔ kɔɕˈt͡ɕɛlnɛ] is a village in the administrative district of Gmina Strzałkowo, within Słupca County, Greater Poland Voivodeship, in west-central Poland. The population of the village is 174 (86 males, 88 females).
