= Rudy, Słupca County =

Rudy
- Village
- Location within Poland
- Coordinates: 52°22′10″N 17°48′5″E
- Country: Poland
- Voivodeship: Greater Poland
- County: Słupca
- Gmina: Strzałkowo
- Population: 180

Rudy [ˈrudɨ] is a village in the administrative district of Gmina Strzałkowo, within Słupca County, Greater Poland Voivodeship, in west-central Poland.
