= Podkornaty =

- Village
- Location within Poland
- Coordinates: 52°20′22″N 17°48′30″E
- Country: Poland
- Voivodeship: Greater Poland
- County: Słupca
- Gmina: Strzałkowo
- Population: 20

Podkornaty [pɔtkɔrˈnatɨ] is a village in the administrative district of Gmina Strzałkowo, within Słupca County, Greater Poland Voivodeship, in west-central Poland.
