= Kokczyn Pierwszy =

- Village
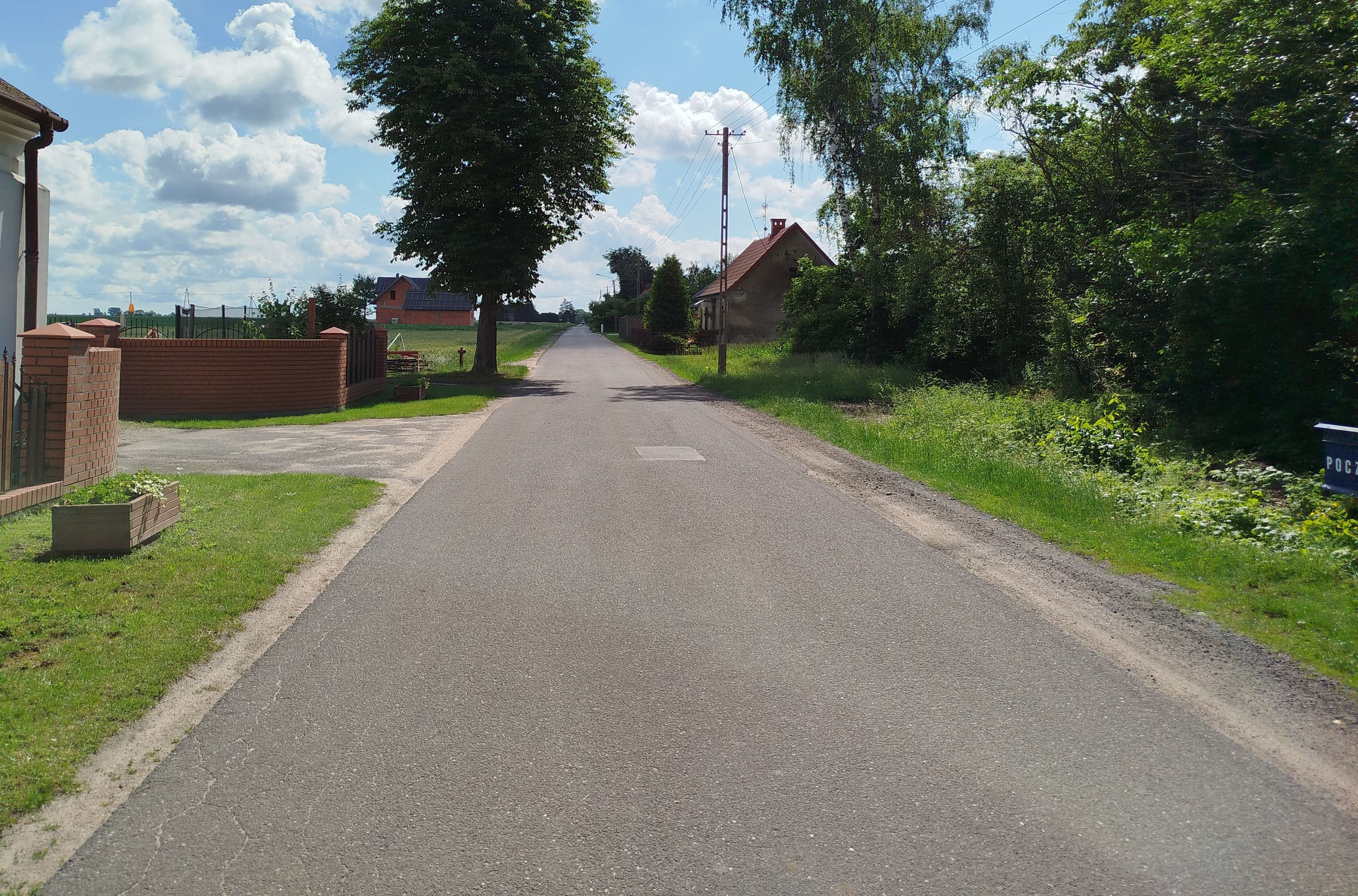

- Location within Poland
- Coordinates: 52°20′28″N 17°47′27″E
- Country: Poland
- Voivodeship: Greater Poland
- County: Słupca
- Gmina: Strzałkowo
- Population: 60

Kokczyn Pierwszy [ˈkɔkt͡ʂɨn ˈpjɛrfʂɨ] is a village in the administrative district of Gmina Strzałkowo, within Słupca County, Greater Poland Voivodeship, in west-central Poland.
