= Johannes Virdung =

German astrologer

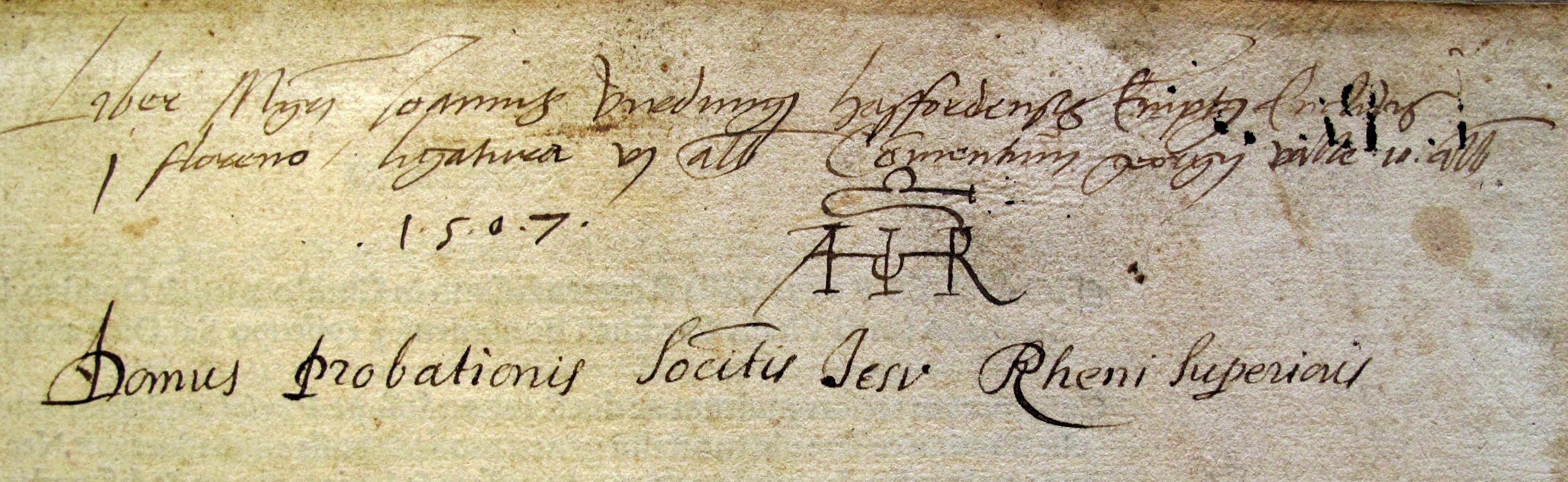

Johann, Hans or Johannes Virdung of Hassfurt (15 March 1463 – 1538/39) was a celebrated astrologer of the early sixteenth century from the Electoral Palatinate. He had an official position at Heidelberg, at the court of the Elector Palatine. He wrote various works under generic names (Prognosticon, Practica), including a millennarian work, Practica von dem Entchrist around 1510.

He was a correspondent of Johannes Trithemius. One of the early sources for the Faust legend occurs in a letter of Trithemius to Virdung.

Virdung studied at the University of Leipzig beginning in 1481, then in Kraków from 1484 to 1486 or 1487. He returned to Leipzig in 1487, where he graduated as a "Magister" in 1491. It has been suggested that Virdung was of the school of the astronomer Albertus de Brudzewo, and had studied with him and Johannes de Glogovia in Kraków.

== Works ==
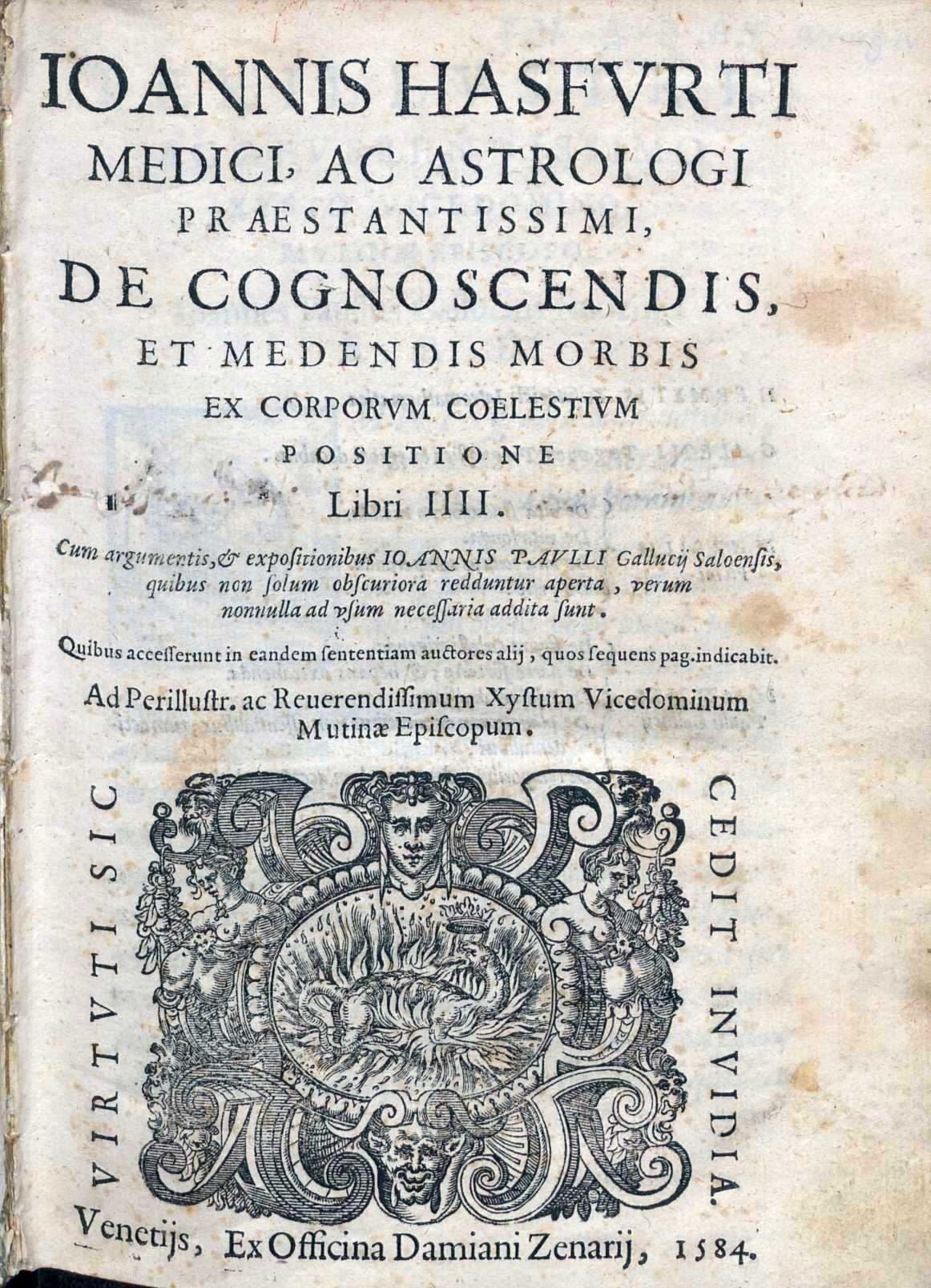
De cognoscendis et medendis morbis ex corporum coelestium positione, 1584

- De cognoscendis et medendis morbis ex corporum coelestium positione (in Latin). Venezia: Damiano Zenaro. 1584.
