= Młodziejewice =

- Village
- Location within Poland
- Coordinates: 52°17′N 17°43′E
- Country: Poland
- Voivodeship: Greater Poland
- County: Słupca
- Gmina: Strzałkowo
- Elevation: 95 m (312 ft)

Młodziejewice [mwɔd͡ʑɛjɛˈvit͡sɛ] is a village in the administrative district of Gmina Strzałkowo, within Słupca County, Greater Poland Voivodeship, in west-central Poland.
