= Babin, Słupca County =

Babin
- Village
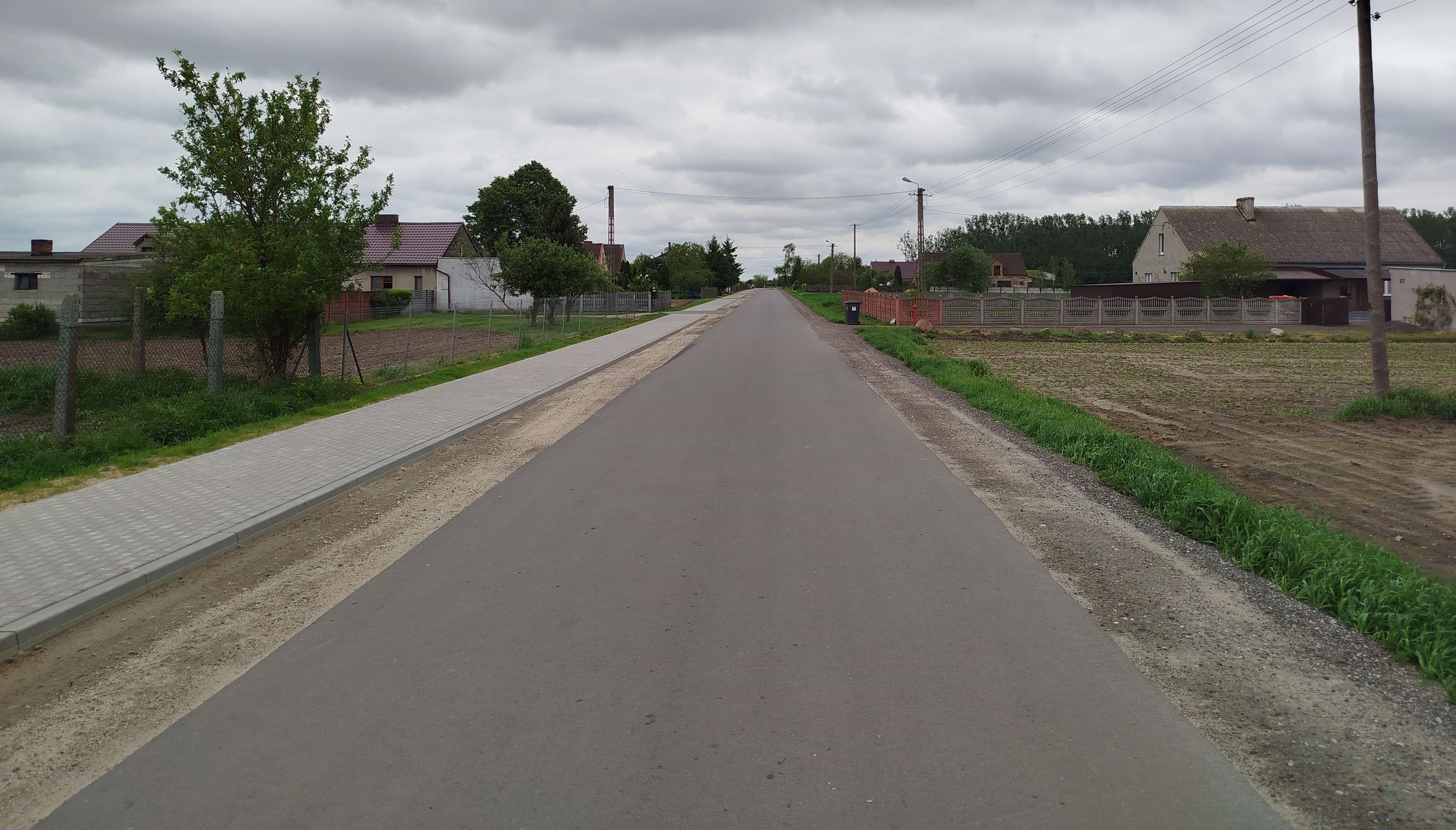

- Location within Poland
- Coordinates: 52°19′52″N 17°52′47″E
- Country: Poland
- Voivodeship: Greater Poland
- County: Słupca
- Gmina: Strzałkowo
- Population: 150

Babin [ˈbabin] is a village in the administrative district of Gmina Strzałkowo, within Słupca County, Greater Poland Voivodeship, in west-central Poland.
