= Brudzewo =

Brudzewo may refer to the following places:

- Brudzewo, Greater Poland Voivodeship (west-central Poland)
- Brudzewo, Lubusz Voivodeship (west Poland)
- Brudzewo, Pomeranian Voivodeship (north Poland)
