= Katarzynowo, Słupca County =

Katarzynowo
- Village
- Location within Poland
- Coordinates: 52°21′N 17°49′E
- Country: Poland
- Voivodeship: Greater Poland
- County: Słupca
- Gmina: Strzałkowo

Katarzynowo [kataʐɨˈnɔvɔ] is a village in the administrative district of Gmina Strzałkowo, within Słupca County, Greater Poland Voivodeship, in west-central Poland.
