= Aleksandrów Kujawski internment camp =

Polish internment camp in Aleksandrów Kujawski, Poland

Coordinates: 52°53′22″N 18°41′06″E

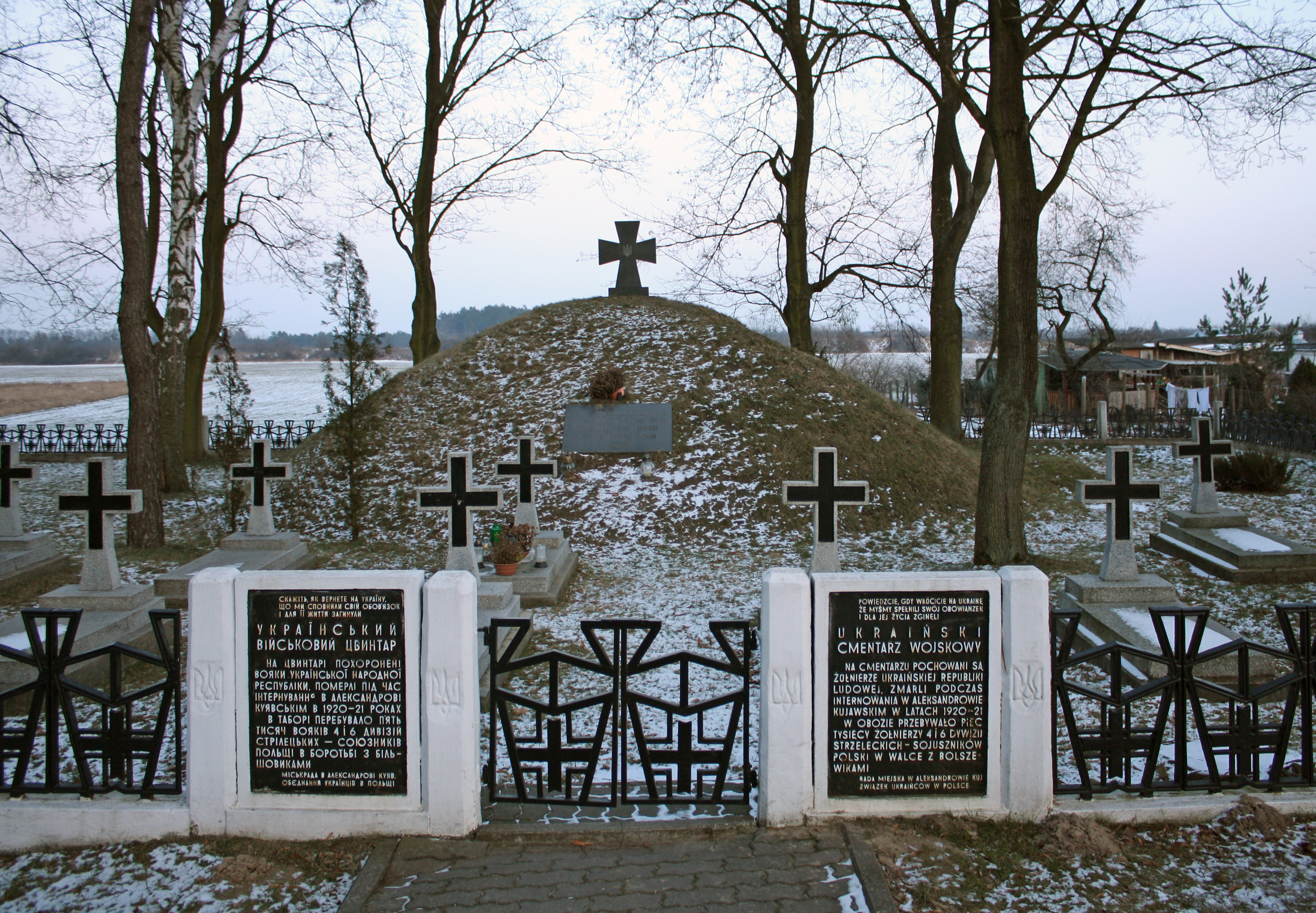
General view of the Ukrainian cemetery in Aleksandrów Kujawski

Internment Camp No. 6 in Aleksandrów Kujawski was a Polish internment camp designated for soldiers of the Ukrainian People's Republic army. It was established as a consequence of the Polish-Soviet armistice agreement of 12 October 1920, the military defeat of the Ukrainian People's Army by the Red Army in November 1920, and the internment of the Ukrainian soldiers on Polish territory. The camp officially operated until 9 October 1921.

Initially intended for three thousand soldiers, the camp housed 3,565 individuals at its peak within less than a year of existence, and over 3,000 internees for most of its operation. It was located in barracks built by the Imperial German Army in 1914 or 1915. The internees were mostly officers and soldiers from the 6th Sich Rifle Infantry Division (the largest group), the 4th Kyiv Division, and the 3rd Iron Division of the Ukrainian People's Army. The camp commander appointed by the Polish military authorities was Major Alfred Jogiel, while the internal Ukrainian commander was General Marko Bezruchko, who had previously commanded the 6th Division.

An essential part of camp life was the cultural and religious activities conducted with the consent of the Polish authorities. There was the Orthodox Brotherhood of the Protection of the Mother of God. Several publications with varying frequencies were issued. The internees also organized a theater, an orchestra, and sports organizations.

== Circumstances of establishment ==
Following the Polish-Soviet armistice agreement on 12 October 1920, the Ukrainian People's Army, which had been fighting in alliance with Poland, suffered defeat at the hands of the Red Army during independent operations in November 1920. Forced to retreat into Poland, the Ukrainian soldiers were subsequently interned. Consequently, the Polish authorities established a network of special internment camps, including one located about one and a half kilometers from the center of Aleksandrów Kujawski. The camp utilized barracks originally constructed by the German military during their occupation of Kuyavia between 1914 and 1915.

These barracks were designed to accommodate 2,000 people temporarily and included a field hospital with 25 beds, a kitchen, a dispensary, and a quarantine facility for infectious disease patients, which could house up to 500 people. After the German withdrawal from Kuyavia in November 1918, the complex was used as a staging point by the State Office for the Return of Prisoners, Refugees, and Workers, temporarily housing Russian workers and prisoners of war returning from Germany to their homeland. After its closure in 1919, it served as the Redistribution Station for the Pomeranian Front, a temporary assembly point for prisoners of war and internees captured by units of the Pomeranian Front. It operated from January to February 1920.

On 14 March 1920, military authorities established Camp No. 6 for prisoners of war in these barracks, designated for interned soldiers of the Russian White 7th Infantry Division, which had entered Polish territory during the so-called Bredov March. These soldiers remained in Aleksandrów Kujawski until July 1920.

=== Organization of the camp ===
The official start date for Internment Camp No. 6 is considered to be 8 December 1920, when Major Alfred Jogiel was appointed as the camp commander. However, the first transports of internees arrived in Aleksandrów Kujawski a few days earlier, on 5 December 1920. According to the Polish military authorities' plans, the camp was intended to house 3,000 people, a number that was reached within a week of its official opening. As of 15 December 1920, the camp housed 900 officers, 2,504 soldiers, 95 women, and 29 children.

In addition to the Polish camp commander, Ukrainian internment camps had Ukrainian commanders appointed by the Ukrainian People's Republic's emigrant military authorities, who held disciplinary authority over the internees. The internees were permitted to engage in cultural, sports, religious, publishing, and artisanal activities within the camp. An internal order unit was responsible for maintaining discipline.

== Living conditions in the camp ==
=== Number and origins of internees ===
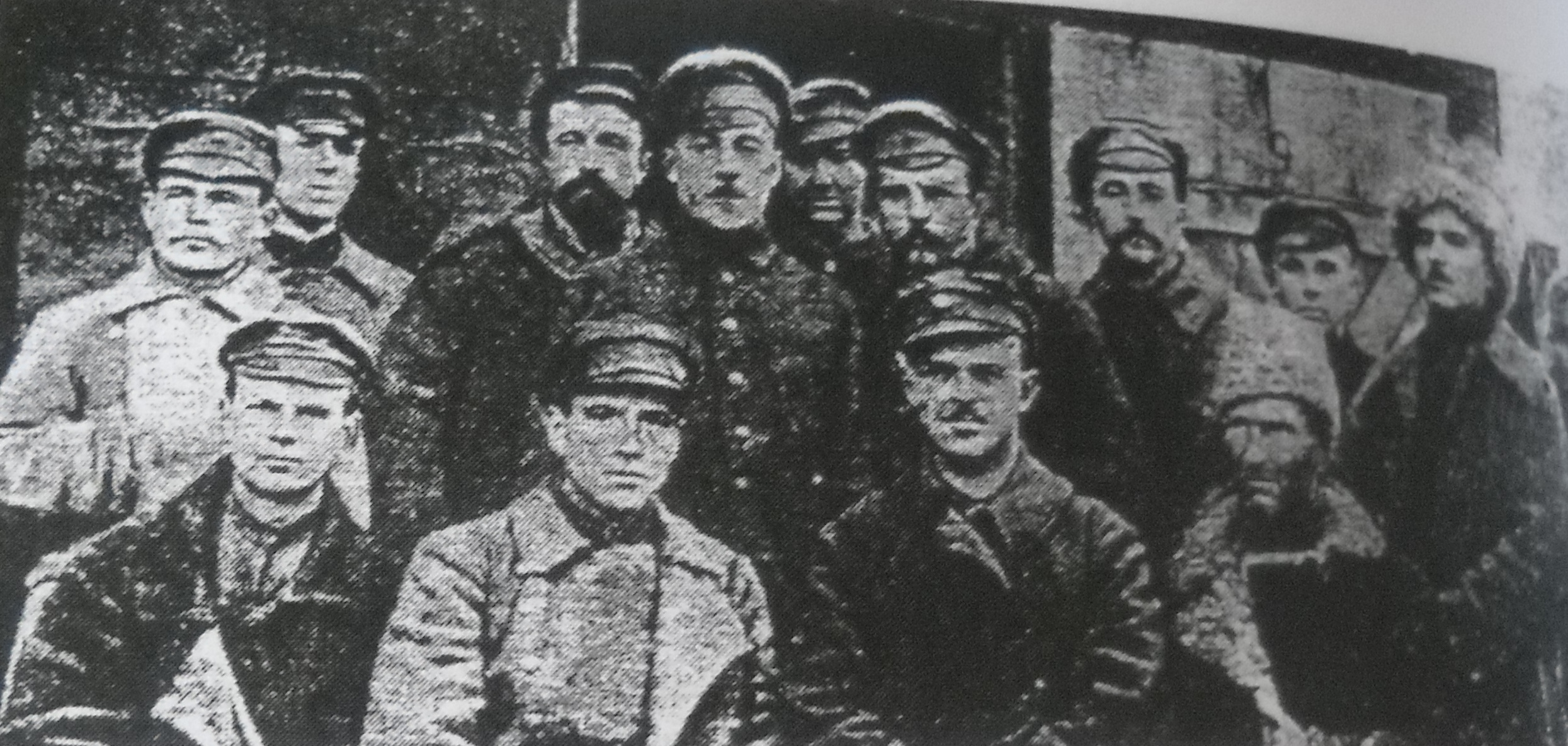
Group of internees forming a cooperative tea house in the camp

The Internment Camp No. 6 in Aleksandrów Kujawski housed soldiers from the 6th Sich Rifle Infantry Division (the largest group), the 4th Kyiv Riflemen Division, and the 3rd Iron Riflemen Division. The number of internees fluctuated, remaining between 3,200 and 3,500 from December 1920 to March 1921, with the peak number of 3,565 recorded on 21 December 1920. This number gradually decreased over time. By 12 October 1921, there were 1,861 inmates in the camp. The largest group consistently comprised rank-and-file soldiers, numbering over 2,000 until May 1921 and dropping to 1,296 by the camp's closure. The number of officers exceeded 800 by March 1921 but eventually fell to 475. The camp also housed several children and a group of women, peaking at 112 in March 1921. The reduction in the number of internees was due to the Polish authorities' efforts to close the camps, with groups of soldiers being sent to work outside the camp (the first group left in August 1921).

Escapes also contributed to the decreasing camp population. This phenomenon intensified in the spring and summer of 1921 when many internees lost hope of another Polish-Soviet war, which they saw as their next opportunity to fight for Ukrainian independence. The Polish authorities did not take extensive measures to prevent escapes, and those who managed to find work usually received the right to stay permanently in their new locations.

=== Living conditions ===
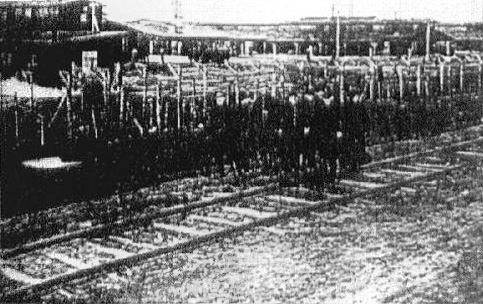
View of the camp barracks, with a group of internees in the foreground (1921)

The Polish military authorities' description of the Aleksandrów camp dates back to when Russian internees inhabited the complex. It comprised 3 barracks, each accommodating 800 people, and 5 smaller barracks, each with 2 kitchen rooms. All these structures were made of wood. The camp command occupied one of the smaller barracks. The camp included a laundry, sanitation facilities, 4 disinfection chambers, and a quarantine room. The buildings were equipped with water supply and sewage systems, and the barracks had electric lighting. However, the facility was entirely unsuitable for winter conditions and lacked a hospital. Therefore, upon arrival in December 1921, the internees had to remain in railway carriages, and the sick were transported to the hospital at Internment Camp No. 15 in Toruń. Emergency repairs to the buildings were carried out by groups of soldiers.

The internees were quartered in the barracks according to their respective units. The highest-ranking officers, led by General Marko Bezruchko, took control of the Ukrainians' activities. Leaving the camp was permitted only with a pass from the Polish military authorities and the approval of Ukrainian officers.

Internees in Polish camps for the soldiers of the Ukrainian People's Army received food according to Table C, ranging from scale A to E, which meant a daily ration of 700 g of bread, 250 g of meat, 700 g of potatoes, 150 g of vegetables, spices, 2 portions of coffee, and 100 g of soap per month. This provision was on par with that of Polish garrison soldiers. However, in practice, Internment Camp No. 6 frequently faced challenges in supplying the expected quantities of provisions – meat and bread were often substituted with additional portions of potatoes and vegetables. Despite the logistical and supply difficulties, the health condition of the camp's inhabitants remained good.

=== Cultural life ===
Immediately upon arrival at the camp, the interned Ukrainians began organizing cultural activities. They were supported in this endeavor by the Polish branch of the YMCA. From at least January 1921, literacy courses were held in every barrack, with 947 illiterates and semi-illiterates attending. By the time the camp was closed, there were no illiterate individuals among the internees. Starting in late February of that year, lectures were organized on topics such as the history and geography of Ukraine, the Ukrainian language, and broader political and moral issues. Officers participated in courses on political economy, geography, and history. The camp had a drama section named after Mykola Sadovsky, which organized performances in the camp theater. 20 internees formed a camp orchestra, and there were similarly sized groups for the choir and the art club. A cinema operated daily. By the spring of 1921, a sports association was active in the camp, organizing an athletics and football tournament as well as a gymnastics display on 29 May 1921. Women in the camp were part of the Union of Ukrainian Women. There was also a cooperative tea house whose members promoted the concept of cooperatives through lectures and the publication Zirnycia.

The camp in Aleksandrów Kujawski was the first internment camp for Ukrainian People's Republic soldiers in Poland where Ukrainians began publishing activities. On 19 December 1920, the first issue of the camp newspaper Nowe żyttia (English: New Life) was published in Ukrainian and distributed to other Ukrainian emigrant communities in the Second Polish Republic.

On 5 April 1921, the camp was visited by Symon Petliura, General Mykhailo Omelianovych-Pavlenko, and General Volodymyr Salsky. It was also visited by British and American missions.

==== Publishing activities ====
The press published in Internment Camp No. 6 was prepared by cultural and educational sections operating within the various divisions from which the soldiers originated and later by cultural societies established within the camp. This activity was highly praised by the Ukrainian camp commanders. The newspapers were intended primarily to boost the morale of the internees, offering articles on the latest events related to the Ukrainian struggle for independence. They were also used as a tool for teaching literacy. Most camp newspapers were printed on duplicating machines, with print runs not exceeding 50 copies. Editors did not receive any remuneration for their work; the papers, in addition to original content, also reprinted articles from Polish periodicals or those from the territory of the Ukrainian People's Republic. The publications were subject to both external and internal censorship.

The cultural and educational section of the 6th Sich Rifle Infantry Division engaged in the most extensive publishing activities. Thanks to the efforts of General Marko Bezruchko, they acquired a printing press in April 1921. This section translated Erich Ludendorff's Cultural and Educational Work in the Army from German and a French brochure The Army We Need. They also published a Ukrainian-Russian dictionary with comparative grammar of both languages. Additionally, a 120-page compendium titled Our Homeland – Ukraine was prepared for printing, which was completed in the camp in Szczypiorno.

An independent publishing initiative was undertaken by the Orthodox Brotherhood of the Protection of the Mother of God, led by Father Piotr Bilon. In addition to a religious-themed magazine, the brotherhood printed a prayer book, a collection of psalms and sermons, texts of the Holy Liturgy, and postcards featuring a photograph of the iconostasis from the camp chapel.

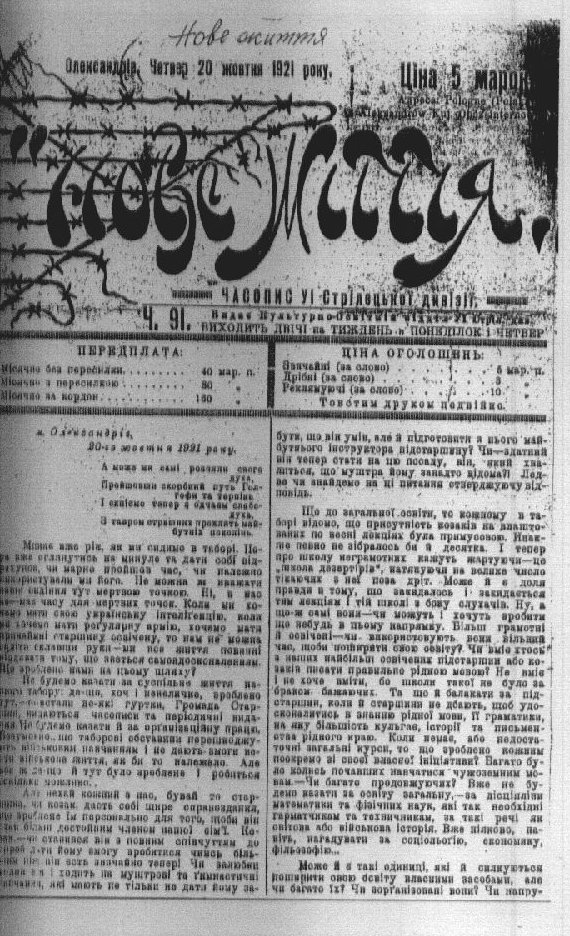
One of the issues of the camp magazine Nowe żittia

===== List of periodicals published in the camp =====
- Almanach: a publication of the Cultural-Educational Department of the 4th Kyiv Division headquarters. Only one 66-page issue was released, focusing on the current situation of Ukrainians and memoirs from the fight for Ukrainian independence;
- Hrimasa (English: Grimace): a satirical magazine edited by a group of soldiers from the 4th Kyiv Division. At least one issue was published;
- Zirnycia (English: Dawn): a journal of the camp cooperative movement, primarily dedicated to cooperative topics. 6 issues were released;
- Komar (English: Mosquito): another satirical magazine. The editors and number of issues published are unknown, as it is only mentioned in memoirs, with no issues found;
- Nasze żittia (English: Our Life): a satirical parody of Nowe życie. The first issue in February 1921 was confiscated by internal censorship, and no further issues were published;
- Nowe żittia (English: New Life): published by soldiers of the 6th Sich Rifle Infantry Division. Hundreds of issues were printed with varying frequency, covering cultural and military topics, analyses of the political situation in Ukraine, and reasons for the failure of the national liberation efforts. It also included news from the camp to foster community integration;
- Okrip (English: Dill): a satirical magazine of the cultural-educational department of the 4th Kyiv Division. It mainly contained humorous texts and puzzles. Memoirs mention 20 issues, of which 3 have been found;
- Połyn (English: Wormwood): a satirical magazine of the 6th Sich Rifle Infantry Division. 6 issues were printed in Aleksandrów and two more in Szczypiorno. It was handwritten and featured caricatures of camp life. No issues have been found to date;
- Religijno-Naukowyj Wisnyk (English: Religious and Scientific Herald): an Orthodox magazine edited by the Brotherhood of the Protection of the Mother of God, which continued its activities in Szczypiorno. It included religious texts, articles on the history of Orthodoxy in Ukraine, and contributions from other Ukrainian emigrant communities;
- Ukrajinśkyj striłeć (English: Ukrainian Rifleman): a military-themed publication of the 6th Sich Rifle Infantry Division in a book format. About 5 issues were published.

=== Religious life ===
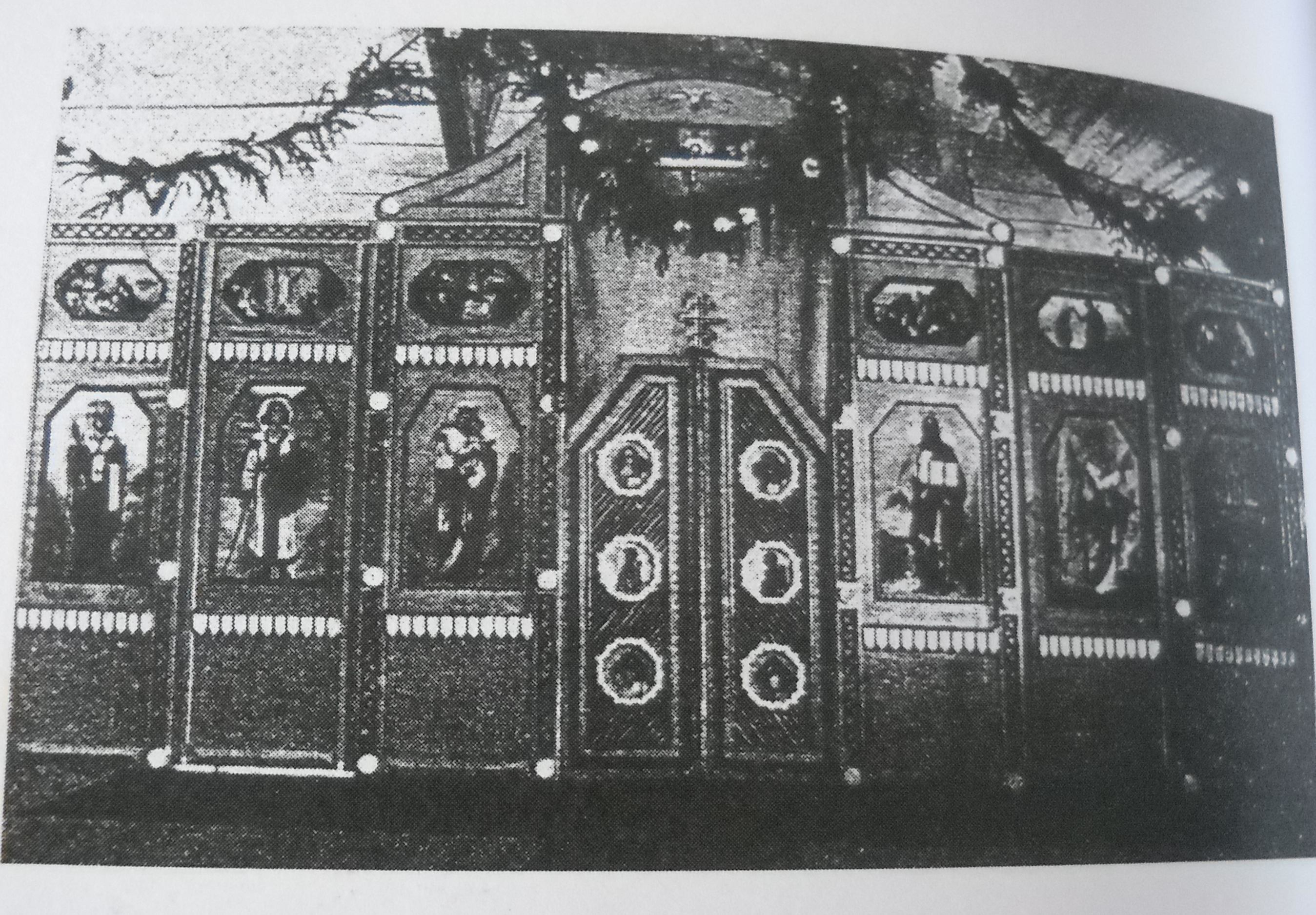
Iconostasis in the camp's St. Nicholas Chapel

The majority of the camp residents were Orthodox Christians. The first chaplain was Father Martynycz, who arrived from Internment Camp No. 3 in Łańcut due to a request from General Marko Bezruchko to Metropolitan George Yaroshevsky and Chief Chaplain of Orthodox Soldiers in the Polish Army, Bazyli Martysz. Before Easter in 1921, Father Martynycz escaped the camp, attempting to reach Soviet Ukraine, but was captured and shot by the Bolsheviks at the Dniester river crossing. He was replaced by Father Petro Bilon, who arrived at the camp as a private soldier and was ordained after completing a theological course. Bilon likely began his duties in February 1921 and by April had initiated the Brotherhood of the Protection of the Mother of God, which had around 100 members and conducted church singing courses alongside its publishing activities.

For the first two months, the internees attended services at St. Alexander Nevsky Church in Aleksandrów Kujawski. During Christmas celebrations in 1921 (January 7 in the Julian calendar), they held a ceremonial procession from the church to the camp, 1.5 km away. The Polish authorities considered this a political demonstration and prohibited further attendance at the church. As a result, the internees set up a chapel in one of the barracks, featuring an iconostasis designed by W. Bokit'ko and constructed by F. Melanuk and M. Krushelnytsky. The Union of Ukrainian Emigrant Women provided embroidered processional banners for the chapel. After the camp's closure, the chapel's furnishings were transferred to the camp in Szczypiorno.

A cemetery was established on the grounds adjacent to the camp for 17 internees who died during their stay. It featured a memorial kurgan with a Zaporizhian cross and a plaque in Ukrainian. The identities of the buried are unknown due to significant post-World War II destruction of the cemetery.

== Closure of the camp ==
Due to the high costs of maintaining internment camps for Russians and Ukrainians, the Polish authorities aimed to close these camps at least since the spring of 1921. The formal closure of the Aleksandrów Kujawski camp was announced on 9 October 1921, following the completion of prisoner exchanges with Soviet Russia. By spring 1922, the fates of those interned who remained in Aleksandrów at the time of the camp’s closure were being decided. 500 individuals were transferred to Camp No. 10 in Kalisz (Szczypiorno), while 1,300 were sent to Camp No. 1 in Strzałkowo. By 25 October 1921, the barracks complex was completely vacated. Interned individuals who found permanent employment were allowed to stay in Aleksandrów with residency rights, forming a Ukrainian colony in the city that lasted until World War II. Some former camp residents moved to other cities in the Pomeranian Voivodeship, creating similar communities in several places, such as Toruń.

== See also ==
- Camps for soldiers of the UNR Army interned in Poland (1919–1924)

== Bibliography ==
- Bieroza, A. (2010). "Kozacki Kurhan w Aleksandrowie Kujawskim". Polski Żołnierz Prawosławny (in Polish). 3 (65). ISSN 1233-7587.
- Karpus, Zbigniew (2008). "Obozy uchodźców, jeńców i internowanych w Aleksandrowie Kujawskim 1918-1921". In Wiszka, E. (ed.). Aleksandrów Kujawski. Obozy jeńców i internowanych 1918-1921 (in Polish). Toruń: Wydawnictwo Naukowe Uniwersytetu Mikołaja Kopernika. ISBN 978-83-231-2212-8.
- Urbański, A. (1998). "Ukraiński cmentarz wojskowy w Aleksandrowie Kujawskim". Pomorze I Kujawy (in Polish). 1.
- Waszkiewicz, Z. (2008). "Życie religijne w Obozie Internowanych nr 6 w Aleksandrowie Kujawskim w 1921 roku". In Wiszka, E. (ed.). Aleksandrów Kujawski. Obozy jeńców i internowanych 1918-1921 (in Polish). Toruń: Wydawnictwo Naukowe Uniwersytetu Mikołaja Kopernika. ISBN 978-83-231-2212-8.
- Wiszka, E. (2008). "Ukraińska prasa obozowa wydawana w Aleksandrowie Kujawskim (1920–1921)". Aleksandrów Kujawski. Obozy jeńców i internowanych 1918-1921 (in Polish). Toruń: Wydawnictwo Naukowe Uniwersytetu Mikołaja Kopernika. ISBN 978-83-231-2212-8.
- Wiszka, E. (2005). Emigracja ukraińska w Polsce 1920–1939 (in Polish). Toruń: Mado. ISBN 83-89886-08-1. OCLC 830781355.
- Sbirniak, I. (2008). "Kulturno-oswitna robota w tabori internowanych wijśk UNR Aleksandriw Kujawśkyj u 1920-1921 rr". In Wiszka, E. (ed.). Aleksandrów Kujawski. Obozy jeńców i internowanych 1918-1921 (in Polish). Toruń: Wydawnictwo Naukowe Uniwersytetu Mikołaja Kopernika. ISBN 978-83-231-2212-8.
