= Łężec, Greater Poland Voivodeship =

Łężec
- Village
- Location within Poland
- Coordinates: 52°18′N 17°50′E
- Country: Poland
- Voivodeship: Greater Poland
- County: Słupca
- Gmina: Strzałkowo

Łężec [ˈwɛ̃ʐɛt͡s] is a village in the administrative district of Gmina Strzałkowo, within Słupca County, Greater Poland Voivodeship, in west-central Poland.
