= Gonice Drugie =

- Village
- Location within Poland
- Coordinates: 52°20′30″N 17°44′02″E
- Country: Poland
- Voivodeship: Greater Poland
- County: Słupca
- Gmina: Strzałkowo

Gonice Drugie [ɡɔˈnit͡sɛ ˈdruɡʲɛ] is a village in the administrative district of Gmina Strzałkowo, within Słupca County, Greater Poland Voivodeship, in west-central Poland.
