= Bernard Wapowski =

Polish cartographer (1475–1535)

Bernard Wapowski (1475-1535) was one of the earliest Polish cartographers and is credited for making the first detailed map of Poland in 1526. Wapowski is considered to be the "Father of Polish Cartography". Wapowski served as the secretary of King Sigismund the Old and made several advancements in Polish cartography by creating several maps of Eastern Europe including Poland, Sarmatia, Scandinavia, Warmia (Ermland), and Pomerania with some assistance from Nicolaus Copernicus.

== Life ==
Wapowski was born near Przemyśl at the family's village of Wapowce (hence his surname, the adjective formed from the village's name). Wapowski's first map of Poland is believed to have been made in Rome around 1505-1506. Wapowski arrived in Rome in 1505 where he joined Erasme Ciołk's Polish Embassy, was introduced to Pope Jules II by the Ambassador, and was placed under the protection of Cardinal Peirre Jules II. Wapowski stayed in Rome for several years at the Court of the Holy See where he worked on his map of the Jagellonian States using Cardinal Nicolas de Cuse's map that was printed in 1491. In 1526 Wapowski was serving as secretary to the King of Poland when Nicolaus Copernicus assisted him in mapping the Kingdom of Poland and the Grand Duchy of Lithuania. Wapowski studied at the University of Kraków where he and his life-long friend Nicolaus Copernicus were taught by Albert Brudzewski.

In the 15th century the birth of modern cartography took place after the rediscovery of Ptolemy's Geography (150.A.D.) and Wapowski drafted maps of Polish and Rutherian lands for the 1507 and 1508 editions of Geography. Wapowski also assisted his friend Marco Beneventano in revising Cardinal Nicholas of Cusa's map of Germany for the Rome edition of Geography in 1507. Wapowski's most notable map was created and published in Kraków in 1526 and was the first large-scale (1:1,260,000) map of Poland and is the earliest extant map of Poland according to the highest scientific standards. Many of Wapowski's maps, including the famous 1526 map of Poland, were printed and published by Florian Ungler.

Nicolaus Copernicus learned skills in cartography to assist with Wapowski's map in 1507 and drew a map of Prussia in 1510. Wapowski also assisted Copernicus with his work; in 1535 Wapowski published an Almanach that contained Copernicus's astrological tables from De Revolutionibus. Wapowski did some historical writing as well; he wrote a continuation of Jan Długosz's History of Poland. Wapowski and his maps influenced other cartographers. The 1526 maps of Poland might have been used by Gerard Mercator (1554) and Sebastian Muenster for drafting maps of Europe. Other cartographers influenced by Wapowski include: Waclaw Grodecki and Andreas Pograbka

In 1535, Bernard Wapowski wrote a letter to a gentleman in Vienna urging him to publish an enclosed almanac, which he claimed was written by Copernicus. This is the first and only mention of a Copernicus almanac in the historical records. The almanac was likely Copernicus's tables of planetary positions. The Wapowski letter mentions Copernicus's theory about the motions of the earth. Nothing came of Wapowski's request because he died a couple of weeks later.

== Rediscovery and restoration ==
Currently, none of Wapowski's maps are intact and have been lost to time. It is most likely that Wapowski's maps burnt in the Great Fire of 1528 in Kraków, the capital of Poland at the time. Only fragments of Wapowski's maps have been found. In 1932, fragments of Wapowski's map of 1528 were accidentally discovered by Casimir Piekarski in the bindings of a Bochnia's salt register. In 1935, Dr. Charles Buczek worked on restoring Wapowski's map from the fragments. These fragments were preserved in the Warsaw Central Archives of Old Records, but were destroyed by the Germans in the uprising in Warsaw in 1944.

== See also ==
- List of Poles
