= Graboszewo, Słupca County =

Graboszewo
- Village
- Location within Poland
- Coordinates: 52°16′N 17°45′E
- Country: Poland
- Voivodeship: Greater Poland
- County: Słupca
- Gmina: Strzałkowo
- Elevation: 90 m (300 ft)

Graboszewo [ɡrabɔˈʂɛvɔ] is a village in the administrative district of Gmina Strzałkowo, within Słupca County, Greater Poland Voivodeship, in west-central Poland.
