= Janowo-Olędry =

- Village
- Location within Poland
- Coordinates: 52°22′26″N 17°49′51″E
- Country: Poland
- Voivodeship: Greater Poland
- County: Słupca
- Gmina: Strzałkowo

Janowo-Olędry [jaˈnɔvɔ ɔˈlɛndrɨ] is a village in the administrative district of Gmina Strzałkowo, within Słupca County, Greater Poland Voivodeship, in west-central Poland.
