= Michał Falkener =

Polish philosopher and astrologer

Michael Falkener, Michael of Wroclaw or Michael de Wratislava (Polish: Michał Wrocławczyk; Latin: Michael Vratislaviensis; ca. 1450 or 1460 in Wrocław – 1534) was a Silesian Scholastic philosopher, astronomer, astrologer, mathematician, theologian, philologist, and professor of the Kraków Academy.

== Life ==
Michał Falkener was born in Silesia to a family of wealthy German burghers. In Latin—the language favored by medieval European scholars, and used in his works—he is sometimes referred to as "Vratislaviensis" or "Wratislaviensis" ("the Wrocławian") in addition to "Michaelis de Vratislauia" ("Michael of Wrocław"). In Polish he is, respectively, "Wrocławczyk" and "Michał z Wrocławia" ("Michael of Wrocław"). In German, the place identifier is "of Breslau"—"von Breslau" or "aus Breslau."

Falkener entered the arts faculty of the Kraków Academy in 1478, earning his bachelor's in 1481 and defending his master's thesis in 1488. Later he lectured there on astronomy, astrology, mathematics, physics, logic, grammar, and rhetoric, as well as scholastic and Aristotelian philosophy. His students included Nicolaus Copernicus. In 1495 he entered the Collegium Minus, and in 1501 the Collegium Maius. In 1512 he joined the theological faculty, where he earned a doctorate in 1517. He twice (1499 and 1504) served as rector of the faculty of arts. For several years he headed the Bursa Niemiecka, succeeding John of Głogów.

Falkener was a Thomist but an incomplete one since, in addition to Peripatetic-Thomist proofs for the existence of God, he also accepted St. Anselm's proofs. In addition to more medieval pursuits, Falkener was interested in humanism: he knew and taught on classical and humanist authors, appreciating their linguistic and artistic abilities in particular. He published and edited important introductions to and commentaries on song collections and religious texts. Falkener's first printed astrological predictions were published for the years 1494–95; 1506 saw the first edition of his Introductorium astronomiae Cracoviensis elucidans almanach.

He bequeathed his personal library to the Kraków Academy.

== See also ==
- History of philosophy in Poland
- List of Poles
- Gesamtkatalog der Wiegendrucke

== Works ==
- Iudicium Cracoviense. Leipzig, 1494.
- Introductorium astronomie Cracoviense elucidans Almanach. Kraków, 1506; Kraków, 1507; Kraków, 1513; Kraków, 1517
- Introductorium Dyalecticae quod congestum logicum appellatur. Kraków, 1509; Nuremberg, 1511 ; Kraków, 1515; Argentoratum/Strasbourg, 1515 .
- Expositio hymnorumque interpretatio pro iuniorum eruditione. Kraków: J. Haller, 1516. (Collection of psalms, hymns and chants with a literary critical introduction and philosophico-theological commentaries.)
- Epithoma figurarum in libros physicorum et De anima Arystotelis. Kraków, J. Haller, 1518.
- Epithoma conclusionum theologicalium: pro introductione in quator libros sententiarum magistri Petri Lombardi. Kraków: J. Haller, 1521.
- Prosarum dilucidatio ac earundem interpretatio... pro studiorum eruditione. Kraków: F. Ungler, 1530. (Collection of church texts, both rhymed and unrhymed, with commentary.)

=== Works as editor ===
- Computus novus totius fere astronomiae fundamentum pulcherrimum continens. Kraków: drukarnia J. Haller, 1517; Kraków: J. Haller, 1504; Lipsk: J. Tanner, 1504; Kraków, 1508; Kraków 1514 (2 edycje); Kraków, 1518 (2 editions); Kraków, 1524; and others. (Collection of astronomical lessons and mnemonic verses.)

== Literature ==
- Ludwik Nowak, Michael Falkener de Vratislavia, Congestum logicum, Introductonium dialecticae, published by Akademia Teologii Katolickiej (Academy of Catholic Theology), 1990.
- Bibliografia Literatury Polskiej – Nowy Korbut, vol. 2 Piśmiennictwo Staropolskie, Państwowy Instytut Wydawniczy, Warszawa 1964, p. 154–155.
