= Janowo-Cegielnia =

- Settlement
- Location within Poland
- Coordinates: 52°22′N 17°49′E
- Country: Poland
- Voivodeship: Greater Poland
- County: Słupca
- Gmina: Strzałkowo

Janowo-Cegielnia [jaˈnɔvɔ t͡sɛˈɡʲɛlɲa] is a settlement in the administrative district of Gmina Strzałkowo, within Słupca County, Greater Poland Voivodeship, in west-central Poland.
