= Babin-Olędry =

- Village
- Location within Poland
- Coordinates: 52°20′27″N 17°52′5″E
- Country: Poland
- Voivodeship: Greater Poland
- County: Słupca
- Gmina: Strzałkowo
- Population: 140

Babin-Olędry [ˈbabin ɔˈlɛndrɨ] is a village in the administrative district of Gmina Strzałkowo, within Słupca County, Greater Poland Voivodeship, in west-central Poland.
