= Kokczyn Drugi =

- Village
- Location within Poland
- Coordinates: 52°22′10″N 17°46′58″E
- Country: Poland
- Voivodeship: Greater Poland
- County: Słupca
- Gmina: Strzałkowo
- Population: 40

Kokczyn Drugi [ˈkɔkt͡ʂɨn ˈdruɡi] is a village in the administrative district of Gmina Strzałkowo, within Słupca County, Greater Poland Voivodeship, in west-central Poland.
