= Wólka, Greater Poland Voivodeship =

Wólka
- Village
- Location within Poland
- Coordinates: 52°19′N 17°47′E
- Country: Poland
- Voivodeship: Greater Poland
- County: Słupca
- Gmina: Strzałkowo

Wólka [ˈvulka] is a village in the administrative district of Gmina Strzałkowo, within Słupca County, Greater Poland Voivodeship, in west-central Poland.
