= Sierakowo, Słupca County =

Sierakowo
- Village
- Location within Poland
- Coordinates: 52°19′38″N 17°51′05″E
- Country: Poland
- Voivodeship: Greater Poland
- County: Słupca
- Gmina: Strzałkowo

Sierakowo [ɕɛraˈkɔvɔ] is a village in the administrative district of Gmina Strzałkowo, within Słupca County, Greater Poland Voivodeship, in west-central Poland.
