= Słomczyce =

- Village
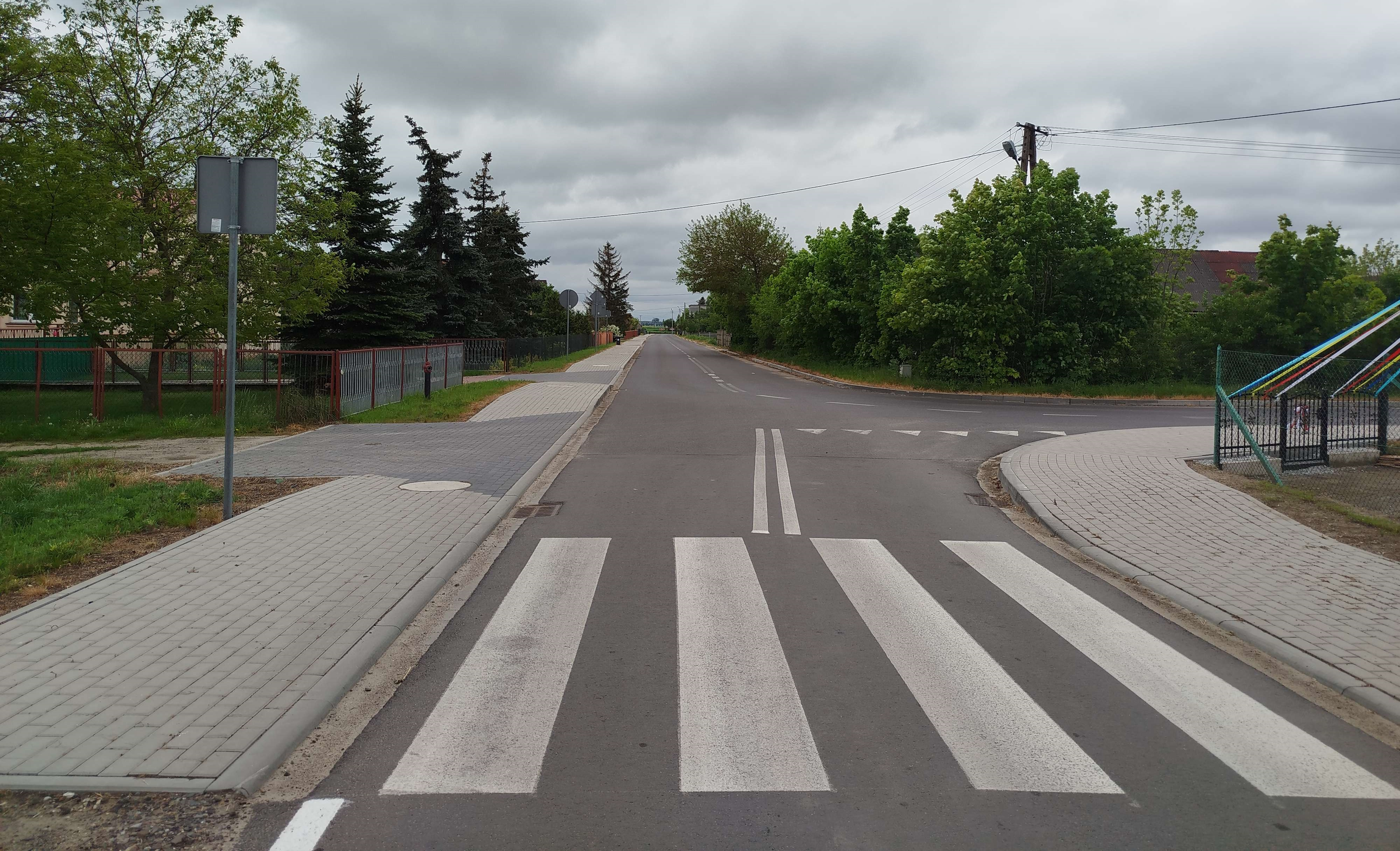

- Location within Poland
- Coordinates: 52°18′54″N 17°52′24″E
- Country: Poland
- Voivodeship: Greater Poland
- County: Słupca
- Gmina: Strzałkowo
- Population: 120

Słomczyce [swɔmˈt͡ʂɨt͡sɛ] is a village in the administrative district of Gmina Strzałkowo, within Słupca County, Greater Poland Voivodeship, in west-central Poland.
