= Uścięcin =

- Settlement
- Location within Poland
- Coordinates: 52°17′N 17°44′E
- Country: Poland
- Voivodeship: Greater Poland
- County: Słupca
- Gmina: Strzałkowo

Uścięcin [uɕˈt͡ɕɛnt͡ɕin] is a settlement in the administrative district of Gmina Strzałkowo, within Słupca County, Greater Poland Voivodeship, in west-central Poland.
