= Staw, Słupca County =

Staw
- Village
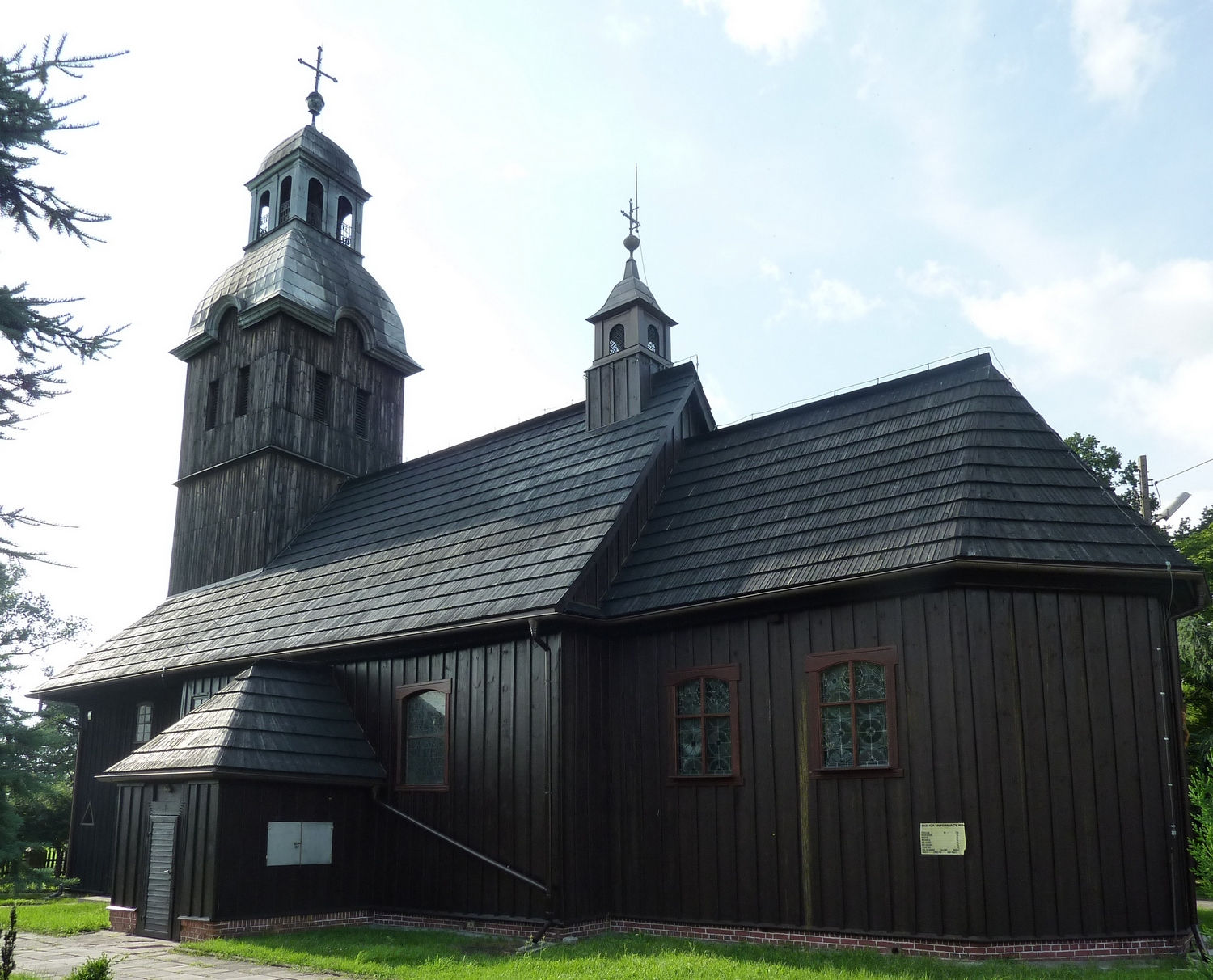

- Location within Poland
- Coordinates: 52°19′43″N 17°45′57″E
- Country: Poland
- Voivodeship: Greater Poland
- County: Słupca
- Gmina: Strzałkowo

Staw [staf] is a village in the administrative district of Gmina Strzałkowo, within Słupca County, Greater Poland Voivodeship, in west-central Poland.
