= Brudzew =

Brudzew may refer to the following places:

- Brudzew, Kalisz County in Greater Poland Voivodeship (west-central Poland)
- Brudzew, Turek County in Greater Poland Voivodeship (west-central Poland)
- Brudzew, Łódź Voivodeship (central Poland)
