= Skarboszewo, Greater Poland Voivodeship =

Skarboszewo
- Village
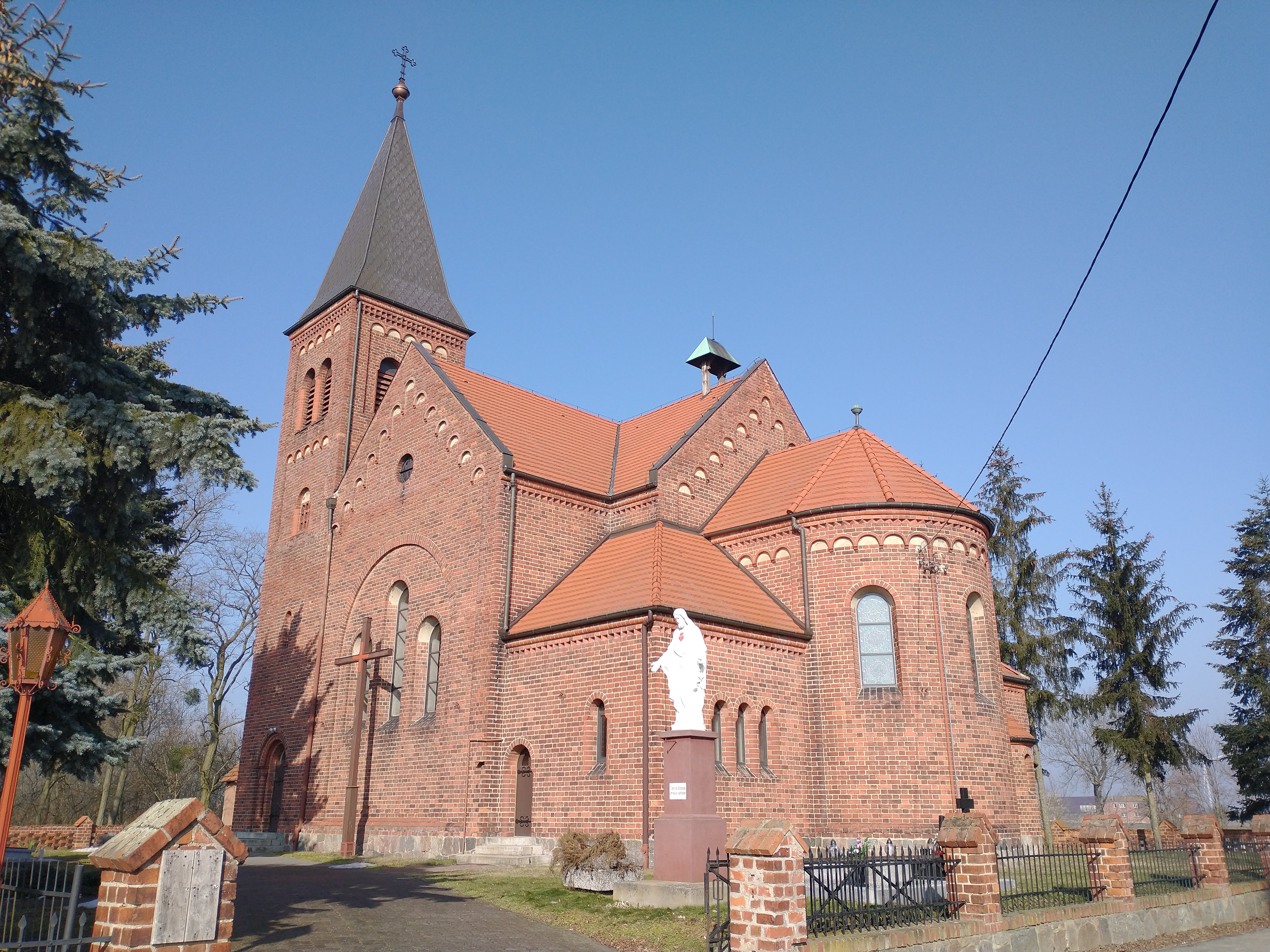
- Church of Holy Trinity

- Location within Poland
- Coordinates: 52°16′29″N 17°48′19″E
- Country: Poland
- Voivodeship: Greater Poland
- County: Słupca
- Gmina: Strzałkowo
- Highest elevation: 95 m (312 ft)
- Lowest elevation: 90 m (300 ft)

Skarboszewo (German 1939–1945 Karben) [skarbɔˈʂɛvɔ] is a village in the administrative district of Gmina Strzałkowo, within Słupca County, Greater Poland Voivodeship, in west-central Poland.
