= Brudzewo, Greater Poland Voivodeship =

Brudzewo
- Village
- Location within Poland
- Coordinates: 52°21′N 17°46′E
- Country: Poland
- Voivodeship: Greater Poland
- County: Słupca
- Gmina: Strzałkowo

Brudzewo ([bruˈd͡zɛvɔ]; German: 1939–1945 Brückenau) is a village in the administrative district of Gmina Strzałkowo, within Słupca County, Greater Poland Voivodeship, in west-central Poland.

== Notable people ==
- Albert Brudzewski (c.1445–c.1497), astronomer, mathematician, philosopher and diplomat
