= Kościanki, Słupca County =

Kościanki
- Village
- Location within Poland
- Coordinates: 52°16′57″N 17°44′05″E
- Country: Poland
- Voivodeship: Greater Poland
- County: Słupca
- Gmina: Strzałkowo

Kościanki [kɔɕˈt͡ɕanki] is a village in the administrative district of Gmina Strzałkowo, within Słupca County, Greater Poland Voivodeship, in west-central Poland.
