= Chwałkowice, Greater Poland Voivodeship =

Chwałkowice
- Village
- Location within Poland
- Coordinates: 52°20′01″N 17°44′06″E
- Country: Poland
- Voivodeship: Greater Poland
- County: Słupca
- Gmina: Strzałkowo

Chwałkowice [xfau̯kɔˈvit͡sɛ] is a village in the administrative district of Gmina Strzałkowo, within Słupca County, Greater Poland Voivodeship, in west-central Poland.
