= Strzałkowo, Greater Poland Voivodeship =

Strzałkowo
- Village
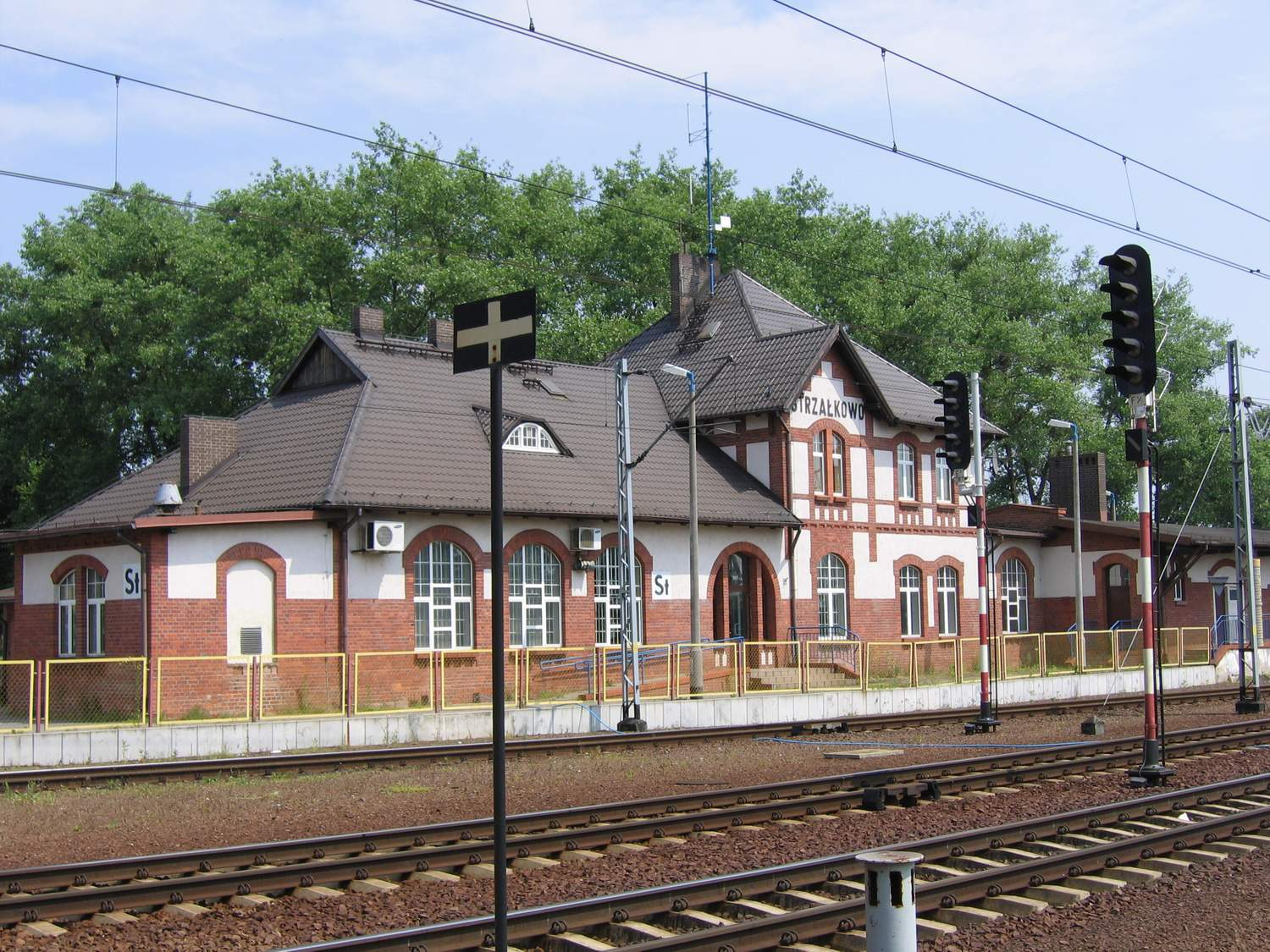
- Railway station

- Location within Poland
- Coordinates: 52°18′36″N 17°49′5″E
- Country: Poland
- Voivodeship: Greater Poland
- County: Słupca
- Gmina: Strzałkowo
- Population: 4,953
- Time zone: UTC+1 (CET)
  - Summer (DST): UTC+2 (CEST)
- Vehicle registration: PSL
- Website: http://www.strzalkowo.pl

Strzałkowo [stʂau̯ˈkɔvɔ] is a village in Słupca County, Greater Poland Voivodeship, in west-central Poland. It is the seat of the gmina (administrative district) called Gmina Strzałkowo.

== History ==
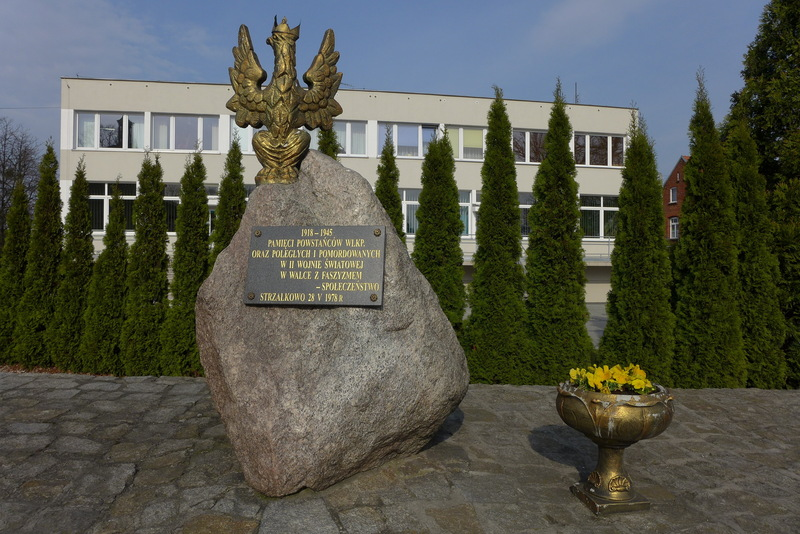
Monument to insurgents of the Greater Poland uprising of 1918-1919 and victims of Nazi Germany in World War II

Strzałkowo was a private village of Polish nobility, administratively located in the Pyzdry County in the Kalisz Voivodeship in the Greater Poland Province of the Polish Crown. It was owned by the Strzałkowski, Węsierski and Korytowski families. In the late 19th century, it had a population of 462.

During World War I, it was the location of a German prisoner-of-war camp for tens of thousands of Allied POWs of various nationalities.

During the World War II German occupation, in November 1940, the occupiers carried out expulsions of Poles from Strzałkowo. Expelled Poles were deported to the Kraków District of the General Government in German-occupied southern Poland, while their farms were handed over to German colonists as part of the Lebensraum policy.

== Cuisine ==
The officially protected traditional food originating from Strzałkowo is local butter (Masło ze Strzałkowa), as designated by the Ministry of Agriculture and Rural Development of Poland.

== Sports ==
The local football team is Polanin Strzałkowo. It competes in the lower leagues.

== Notable people ==
- Jerzy Młokosiewicz (1923–1995), Home Army soldier and participant of the Warsaw Uprising during World War II, Polish deputy minister of finance
- Leon Michalski (1915–1979), officer of the Polish Army and the Polish Armed Forces in the West during World War II
- Łukasz Kuropaczewski (born 1981), Polish guitarist
