= Brudzew, Kalisz County =

Brudzew
- Village
- Location within Poland
- Coordinates: 51°55′47″N 17°59′15″E
- Country: Poland
- Voivodeship: Greater Poland
- County: Kalisz
- Gmina: Blizanów
- Population: 470

Brudzew [ˈbrud͡zɛf] is a village in the administrative district of Gmina Blizanów, within Kalisz County, Greater Poland Voivodeship, in west-central Poland.
