= Jan of Głogów =

Polish polyhistor

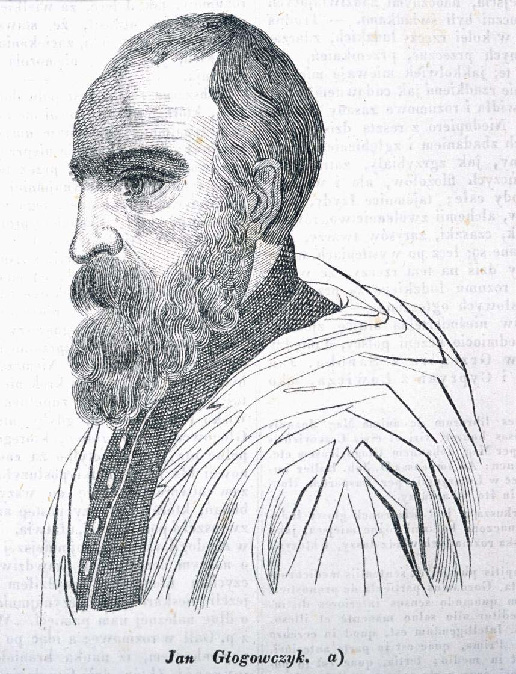
- Born: c. 1445; Głogów, Duchy of Głogów
- Died: February 11, 1507; Kraków, Kraków Voivodeship, Kingdom of Poland
- Burial place: Church of St. Florian, Kraków
- Education: Jagiellonian University
- Occupations: astronomer, philosopher

Jan of Głogów (Polish: Jan z Głogowa, Jan Głogowczyk; German: Johann von Schelling von Glogau) (c. 1445 – 11 February 1507) was a notable Polish polyhistor at the turn of the Middle Ages and Renaissance—a philosopher, geographer and astronomer at the University of Krakow.

== Life ==
John was born into the Schelling (also found as Schilling, Shieling, and Schelink) family in Głogów (in German, Glogau) in the Lower Silesian Duchy of Głogów, which from 1331 had belonged to Bohemia and thus, during his lifetime, to the Holy Roman Empire. He variously styled himself Johannes Glogoviensis, Glogerus, de Glogovia and Glogowita; but while he may have been of German extraction, he never used the name "Schelling."

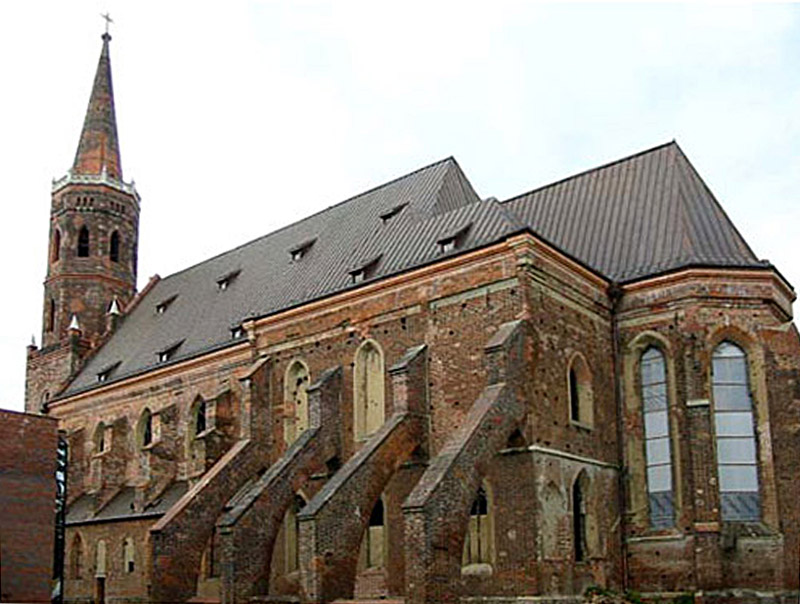
Collegiate Church, Głogów

He began his education in a local school at the Collegiate Church of the Assumption of the Virgin Mary. As the scion of a wealthy bourgeois family, he could continue his education at one of the best universities in that part of Europe: the University of Krakow, which is now known as Jagiellonian University. He embarked on his studies there, at age 16 in 1462, which is the first documented date of his life. After three years he obtained his baccalaureate, and after two more, his licentiate. In 1468 he received his Magister Artium degree, the equivalent of a Doctor of Philosophy degree. This was but the beginning of a forty-year academic career. Throughout these 40 years, John spent one year away from the University of Krakow and spent the academic year at the University of Vienna which took place in 1497–1498. He would later also obtain a baccalaureate in theology.

John of Głogów was an adherent of the Cologne Thomism, a philosophical school that upheld the legacy of Thomas Aquinas. But while siding in some questions with Thomas, in others he sided with Albertus Magnus. John played an important role in revitalizing the work of Albert the Great and Thomas Aquinas as well as devoting his work in philosophy and logics to bring together different scholastic traditions.

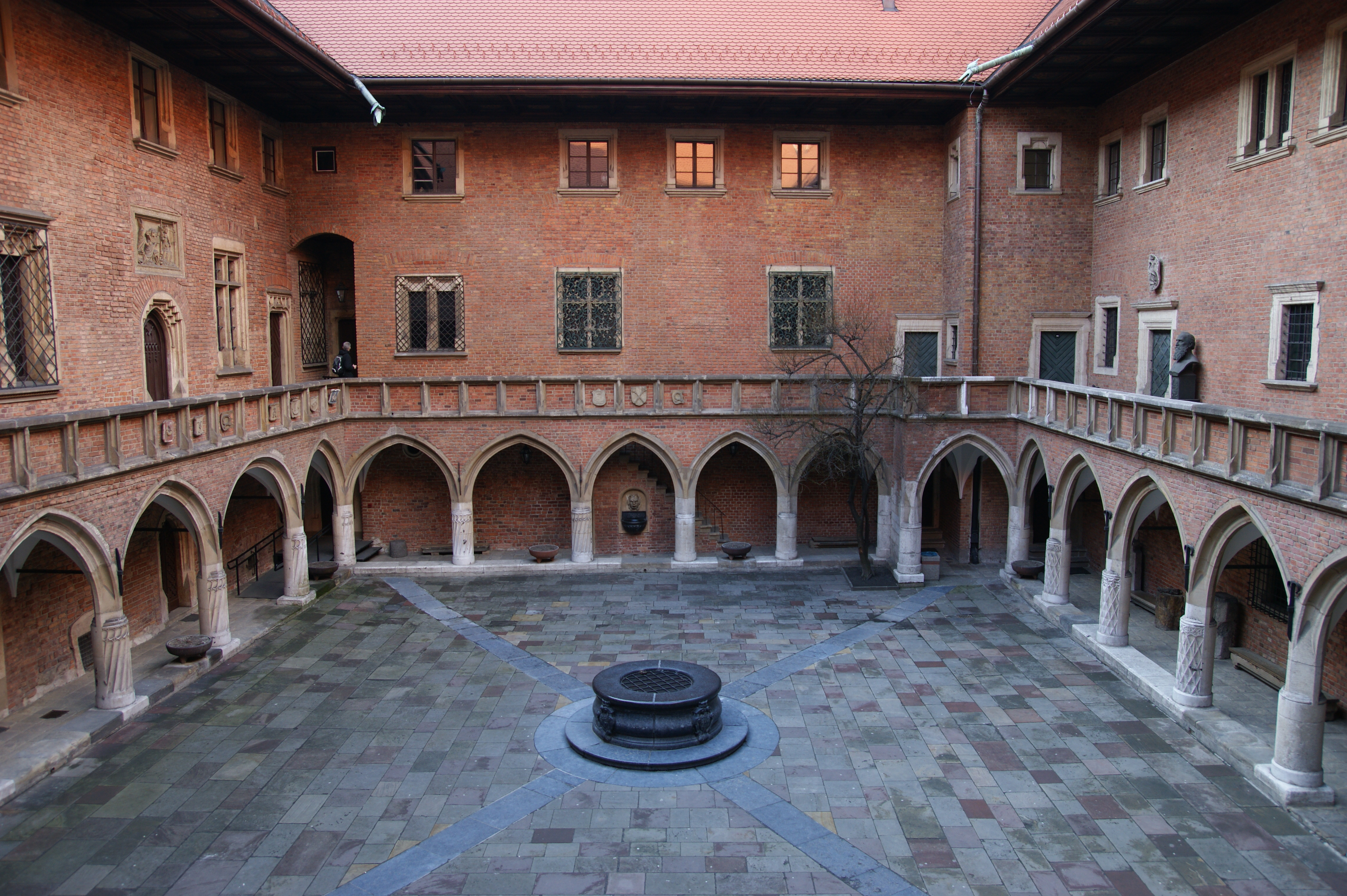
Collegium Maius, Kraków University

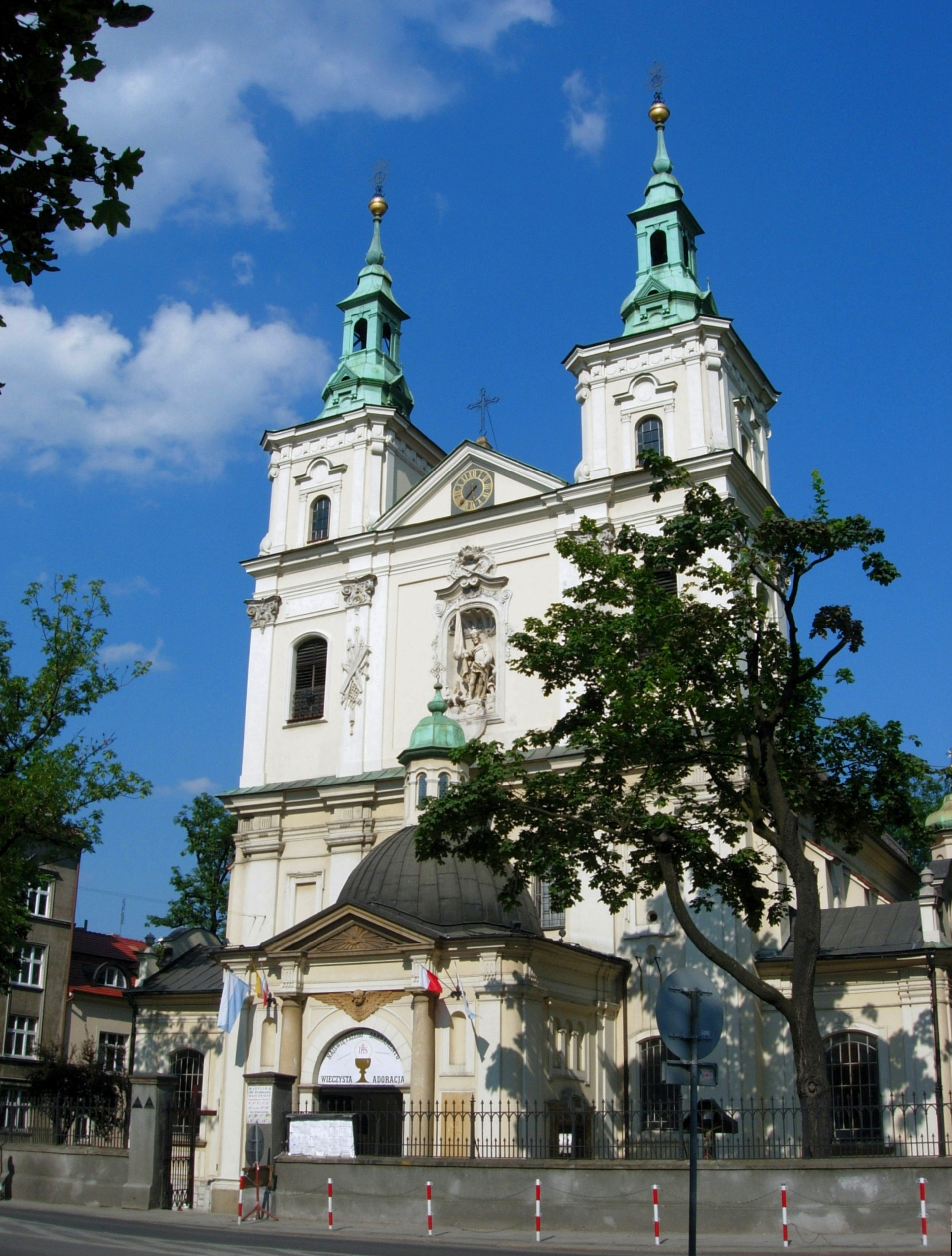
St. Florian's Church, Kraków

From 1468 John lectured in the Department of Arts at the University of Krakow, in all seven liberal arts. His greatest passions were grammar, Aristotelian logic, physics, physiology, and astronomy. Additionally, he was one of the first to show interest in world geography impending the discovery of the New World. In 1478 and 1489–90 he was dean of the department of arts. Jan Haller became John's trusted publisher right before 1500, as well as becoming the biggest publisher in Krakow at that time. Haller published many of John's works, such as the books John wrote on subjects being taught at the university for the students there. He wrote textbooks covering the complete range of philosophical knowledge at the time. His numerous extant works cover medicine, grammar, logic, philosophy, geography, astronomy and astrology. He won fame in the latter field with his "prognostications"; in one of these, he predicted the advent of a "black friar" who would bring disarray to Christianity. The friar would later be identified with the Augustinian friar, Martin Luther.

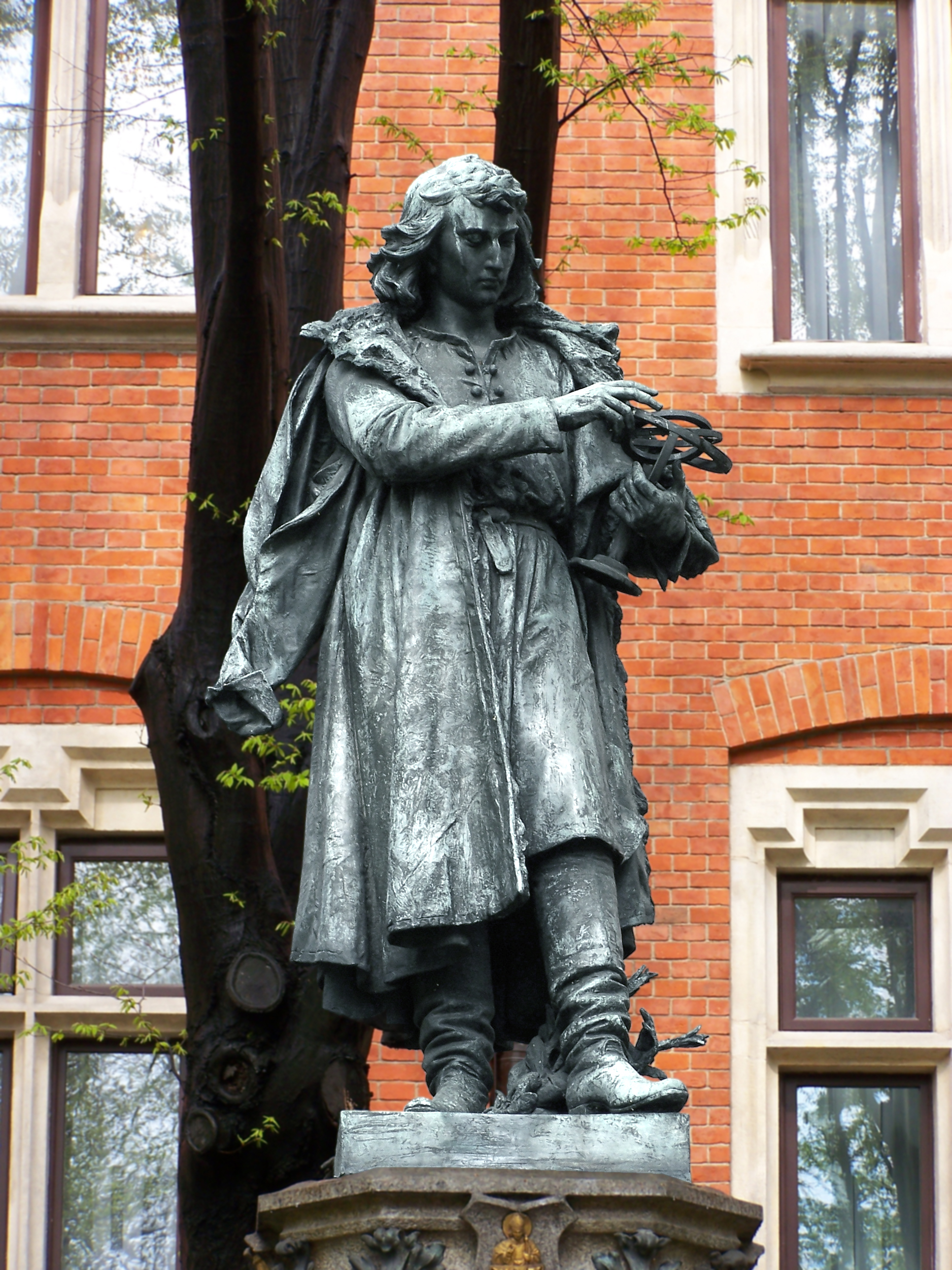
Copernicus (statue before Collegium Novum)

John of Głogów published commentaries on many different figures such as Johannes de Sacrobosco, Aristotle, Alexander de Villa Dei, Peter of Spain, and others. John wrote a work entitled Introductio in artem numerandi (Latin: Introduction to the Art of Using Numbers; 1497). He wrote commentaries to Ptolemy's Cosmography. When John finished his studies and began lecturing, the University of Krakow, at that point, was heavily influenced by Averroistic views, which he did not support. He favored the Ptolemic model of the universe, subscribing to the belief of geocentrism and the existence of physical celestial spheres on which the planets revolved on.

He is thought to have been one of the teachers of Nicolaus Copernicus, who enrolled at the University of Krakow in 1491. In winter of 1493, Copernicus attended the University of Krakow. The following summer, Copernicus attended a course on geography given by John of Głogów which was found by the Almanach that the university yearly produces. Along with teaching Copernicus, John taught a man of the name Wojciech Brudzewo (better known by his anglicized name Albert Brudzewski), who was also known very well in the field of astronomy, and they worked together to try and satisfy astronomers of their time with the state of astronomy.

John of Głogów and Michael of Biestrzycowa, as well as other philosophers, disagreed with the logic of consequences (or treatise on consequences), which entailed the connection of antecedent and consequent, according to the Cracovian authors from the 15th century. John had two main objections, the first point being along the lines of anything can follow from the impossible (which was reportedly supported by Aristotle's work). The second point John disagreed with was that cause and effect cannot be linked to the antecedent and consequent a good consequence. This was during the time that John of Głogów was writing his commentary on Peter of Spain (late 1400s and early 1500s), which consists of five treatises.

John authored 60 volumes, mainly astronomical and astrological. He also put out astrological forecasts each year at the University of Krakow which aided in Copernicus’ basic learning of astrology and planetary theory. Johannes Virdung, a celebrated sixteenth century astrologer, also attended John's lectures at Krakow in 1486. They both composed many of these forecasts that would tell people the best time to travel or bathe as well as the daily elemental conditions and their disposition. John took up this post from 1479 to 1507.

His grammar was used in Kraków schools for over a century. He is reputed to have been the first in Poland to note the discovery of America. John's works show little originality, but his erudition was impressive. John of Głogów became a very prominent teacher, so much so that up to twenty years after his death, his published works were still being taught. As such an influential presence in the university, it is heavily believed that many of his students went on to become instructors of higher education themselves.

His first two years of lecturing had given him entry to the Kraków Academy's Collegium Minus (the Lesser College), and from 1484 he had been a member of the Collegium Maius (the Greater College). Collegiate membership entailed a semi-monastic life and the observation of an uncommonly austere regime. He devoted his income to charitable works.

John took a special interest in students from his native Silesia, building and operating a dormitory for them. The Bursa nova (the hostel or dormitory), built in 1486, opened in 1488 with John of Głogów as the manager. It was located on St. Anne's Street near the back of the greater college, College Mauis. Between 1433 and 1510, 120 scholars from Głogów matriculated at Kraków—one of the largest groups, alongside those from Wrocław.

John of Głogów, an "ornament of Kraków University," died in Kraków on 11 February 1507 and was interred at St. Florian's Church.

== Published works and commentaries ==
John of Glogów wrote extensively on various topics of philosophy, geology, and logic. One of his most notable philosophical work was his commentary on Peter of Spain. In his commentary, John, along with Michael of Biestrzycowa, rejected the paradoxes of strict implication based on the notion of everyday law. In other words, they did not believe Peter of Spain's findings were an accurate model to follow ordinarily. It was suggested that John and Michael were also rejecting conjunctive simplification, but it was never formally confirmed. One of the issues they thought to contest was the domain surrounding antecedents and consequents. Specifically, whether consequent was a subsection of antecedents, weather it was formal or informal, and weather it had a natural connection or a relation to reason. In John's commentary on the seventh treatise of the Summulae (Latin for Summaries), also known as the Parva logicalia, by Peter of Spain, John challenged the historically accepted laws on logic. Specifically, the two rules stating from the impossible anything follows and the necessary follows from anything.

John continued these themes of contradiction in his other commentaries including his commentaries on Aristotle's work. John did not focus on Aristotle's astronomy or Mathematics, but rather Aristotle's metaphysical ideas. He questioned whether the connection between words and concepts was properly allocated for in Aristotle's Book of Predicaments. In addition, John deconstructed and analyzed Aristotle's book of Prior Analysis. Throughout John's commentaries on Aristotle's work, his topics stemmed for one central idea. This idea is whether there are truly relationships between the nature of reality and reasoning. For example, Is the syllogism between the body and soul to the universe accurate. In addition, John introduced some lines of his own thinking like the similarities between humans and animals. This material would be further developed by René Descartes. One of John's last commentaries on Aristotle was comptus chirometralis, which focuses on ethics.

The year before John died, he finished his commentary on Johannes de Sacrobosco. Johannes's publication was called Sphaera. While the piece of work fell under the topic of astronomy, John was able to connect it with astrology also. During this time period, there was a large debate arguing the proper use of celestial orbs. Followers of Ptolemy believed orbs were a combination of epicycles and eccentrics, while followers of Averroe thought orbs needed to be centered around the Earth, therefore epicycles and eccentrics were physically impossible. John, being a strong follower of Ptolemy's science, used his commentary of Johannes's work to argue in favor of orbs being made of epicycles and eccentrics, though his main reason for creating the commentary was to teach it to his students at The University of Kraków. Throughout the commentary, John contradicts Johannes on several points. First, he argues Johannes's circles are not legitimate because mathematical concepts cannot cause celestial objects to move. In addition, John goes on to explain that the Sun is in an eccentric orb, moved by its annual motion, and rotates slowly. Another point john refutes it the number of orbs needed to explain the Moon's motion. John believes 4 orbs are required.

== See also ==
- History of philosophy in Poland
- List of Poles
