= Koszuty =

Koszuty may refer to the following locations in Greater Poland Voivodeship, west-central Poland:

- Koszuty, Słupca County, a village in Słupca County
- Koszuty, Gmina Środa Wielkopolska, a village in Środa County
- Koszuty Małe, a village in Słupca County
- Koszuty-Huby, a village in Środa County
- Koszuty-Parcele, a village in Słupca County
