= Jerzy Waldorff =

Polish media personality, intellectual, socialite, music critic and music aficionado

The Right Honourable Jerzy Waldorff–Preyss
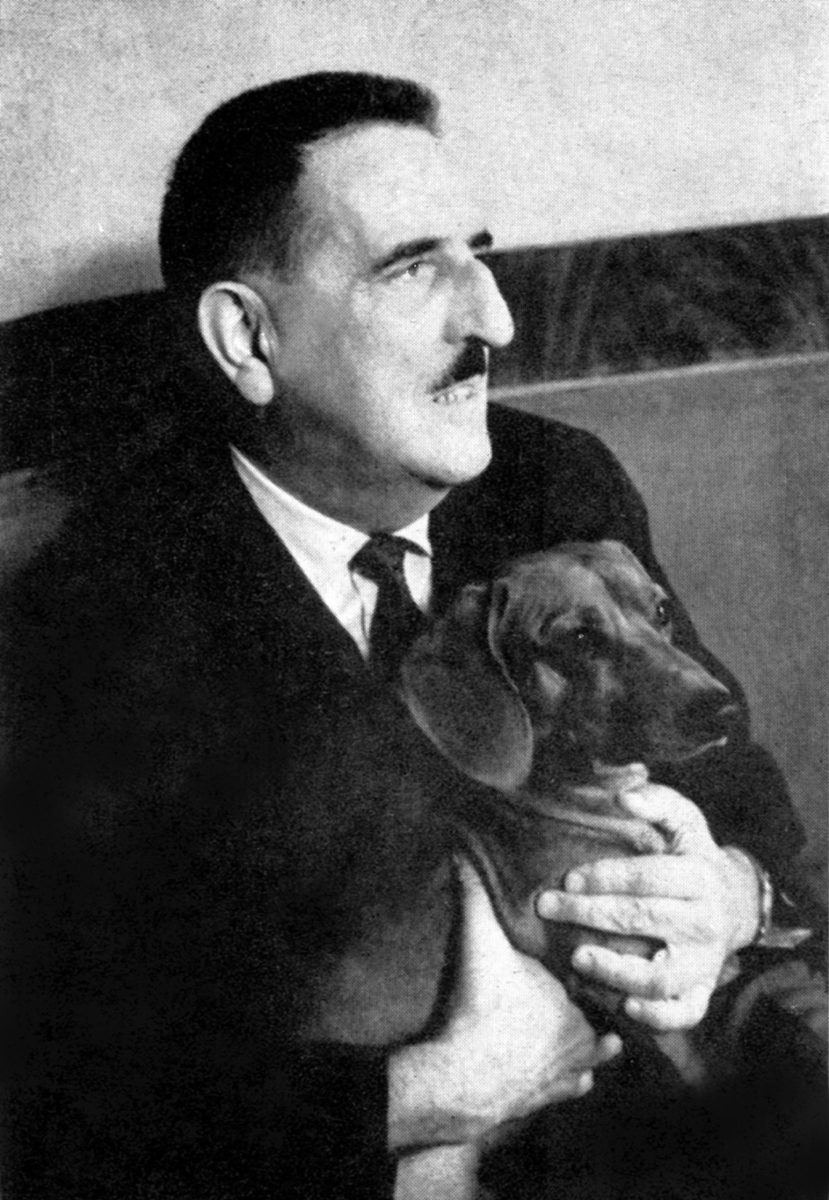
- by Zofia Nasierowska
- Born: Jerzy Preyss; 4 May 1910; Warsaw, Russian Poland
- Died: 29 December 1999 (aged 89); Warsaw, Poland
- Resting place: Powązki
- Education: University of Poznań (M.Jur., 1932)
- Partner(s): Mieczysław Jankowski (1938-1999)
- Writing career
- Notable works: Muzyka łagodzi obyczaje (Music Softens Manners)

Jerzy Waldorff-Preyss of the Nabram coat of arms (4 May 1910 – 29 December 1999) was a Polish media personality, public intellectual, socialite, music critic and music aficionado. He wrote over twenty books, mostly on the subject of classical music and society. Waldorff is known as "the last baron of the Polish People's Republic".

== Biography ==
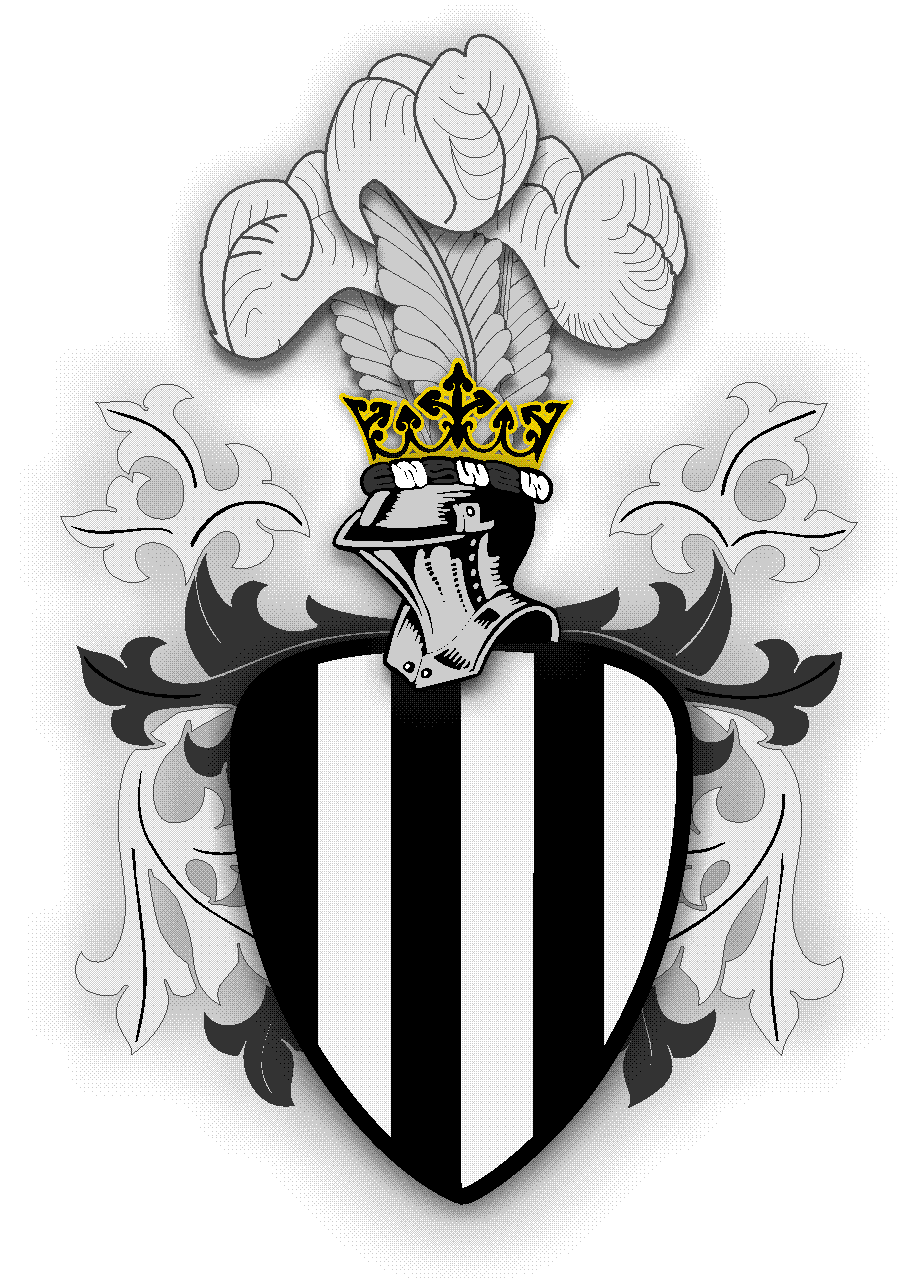
Nabram coat of arms of the Waldorff Family

=== Early life and education ===
Waldorff was born in Warsaw to a Polish engineer and landowner, Witold Preyss. His family moved first to Kościelna Wieś in the historical Kujawy region and then to Rękawczyn, Greater Poland, where his father bought an estate after World War I. Waldorff spent his childhood there, in a manor house at the end of an avenue bordered with 100-year-old lime trees. He wrote later that the family left the estate and moved back to Warsaw soon after his father's death.

Waldorff spent his childhood in Rękawczyn, initially taught by his mother and private tutors. Later he attended liberal arts schools, including gymnasium in Trzemeszno, Saint Mary Magdalene Gymnasium in Poznań, and eventually graduated from Marcinkowski Gymnasium in Poznań (matura 1928).

He studied law at the University of Poznań, and graduated with a Master of Jurisprudence (M.Jur.) in 1932. Following law school, Waldorff became a trainee solicitor at the Warsaw office of the law firm owned by University of Warsaw's distinguished professor Włodzimierz Kozubski, but abandoned law as a profession before being admitted to the bar.

=== Media career ===
Between 1936 and 1939 Waldorff worked as a music-review columnist for the Kurier Poranny newspaper. After the invasion of Poland by Nazi Germany he took part in organizing the clandestine music scene in occupied Warsaw. He was also active in the social support organization called Rada Główna Opiekuńcza (Central Welfare Council), the only cross-country network allowed to function legally under the German administration with some financial aid from the authorities. After the liberation, due to wartime annihilation of Warsaw, Waldorff settled in Kraków between 1946 and 1950, where he wrote for the popular magazine Przekrój.

The long series of essays on music by Waldorff entitled Muzyka łagodzi obyczaje (Music Softens Manners) was published in Poland from 1959 in Świat weekly and from 1969 in Polityka news magazine for most of his professional life, though renamed as Uszy do góry (Prick Up Your Ears) after the Martial law. They were broadcast by Polskie Radio, and presented on TV.

Waldorff organized the Festival of Polish Piano Music in Słupsk and the festival called Chopin w barwach jesieni (Chopin in Autumn Colors) in Antonin at the Hunting Palace of the Prince Radziwiłł family. In 1959 he co-founded the Critics Section of the Association of Polish Music Artists. He also contributed greatly to the establishment of the Karol Szymanowski Muzeum at the "Atma" Manor in Zakopane. In the 1960s Waldorff organized the radio fundraiser and donation drive for the Warsaw Museum of Theatre. In 1974 (or 1977, sources vary) he created the Committee for the Preservation of the Old Powązki Cemetery and served as its president until his death. He also wrote for leading periodicals. Jerzy Waldorff received the title of Honorary Citizen of Warsaw in April 1992.

=== Friendship with Szpilman ===
Waldorff put on paper and elaborated the unwritten memoir of his own friend, the Polish eminent pianist Władysław Szpilman, titled Death of the City (Śmierć miasta), first published in 1946. In the introduction to the first edition of his book Waldorff informed the reader that he wrote the story told to him by Szpilman "as closely as he could", and that he used his brief notes in the process. Szpilman was not a writer, according to the later preface by his own son Andrzej. However, reprints of Szpilman's memoir omitted Waldorff's name, and asserted that the book was authored by the subject himself. The latest edition was slightly expanded and printed under a different title, The Pianist, in line with the 2002 screen version by Polanski, but without a single mention of Jerzy Waldorff as its author, which prompted Henryk Grynberg to question its legality.

=== Personal life, death and legacy ===
Waldorff lived in a same-sex relationship with a classical dancer Mieczysław Jankowski for 61 years. He died on December 29, 1999, and was buried at the Powązki Cemetery in Warsaw in January 2000.

After his death, Waldorff's friends organized the lobbying, so the City Council could give one of the streets in Warsaw his name, which triggered a substantial controversy. Those, who opposed the idea, brought up Waldorff's Stalinist past, alleging that during the Stalinist wave of terror in postwar Poland, Waldorff, being one of Kraków editors of Przekrój, participated in the defamation of Catholic priests accusing the Polish episcopate of actively supporting murderers who attacked socialism. This protest led by the Warsaw chapter of the Association of Former NSZ Soldiers was ignored by the city authorities and eventually street was named after Waldorff in the Bemowo District of Warsaw in 2009.

== Selected books ==
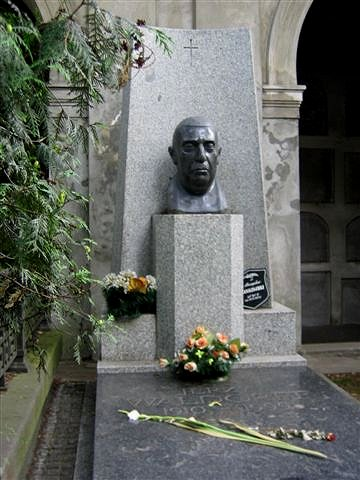
Jerzy Waldorff's monument

- Jerzy Waldorff, Sztuka pod dyktaturą, Instytut Wydawniczy Biblioteka Polska, Warsaw 1939
- Jerzy Waldorff, Śmierć miasta, 1946
- Jerzy Waldorff, Dwie armaty, Warsaw 1955
- Jerzy Waldorff, Sekrety Polihymnii, Iskry, Warsaw 1956; essays, several ed.
- Jerzy Waldorff, Harfy leciały na północ, Warsaw 1968
- Jerzy Waldorff, Diabły i anioły, 1971
- Jerzy Waldorff, Ciach go smykiem!, Warsaw 1972
- Jerzy Waldorff, Moje cienie, Warsaw 1979
- Jerzy Waldorff, Wielka gra. Rzecz o Konkursach Chopinowskich, Warsaw 1980, 1985
- Jerzy Waldorff, Muzyka łagodzi obyczaje: artykuły, recenzje, felietony, Wydawn. Muzyczne, 1982
- Jerzy Waldorff, Cmentarz Powązkowski w Warszawie, Warsaw 1984
- Jerzy Waldorff, Fidrek, Warsaw 1989, 1994; autobiography
- Jerzy Waldorff, Taniec życia ze śmiercią, Wydawn. Muzyczne, Warsaw 1978, 1984, 1993
- Jerzy Waldorff, Za bramą wielkiej ciszy: dwieście lat dziejów Powązek, Interpress, Warsaw 1990
- Jerzy Waldorff, Słowo o Kisielu, Warsaw 1994
- Jerzy Waldorff, Moje lampki oliwne, 1999; autobiography

== Selected filmography ==
- Warsaw Premiere (1951)
