= HellermannTyton =

British registered company

- Industry: Electrical/Electronics
- Founded: 1935
- Products: cable management products
- Revenue: €596.9 million (2014)
- Operating income: €83.0 million (2014)
- Net income: €51.0 million (2014)
- Number of employees: 5,400 (2019)
- Parent: Aptiv PLC
- Website: www.hellermanntyton.com

HellermannTyton is a British registered company with affiliated companies in 40 countries manufacturing and supplying products for fastening, fixing, identifying and protecting cables and their connecting components. The company employs worldwide over 3,800 people. It was listed on the London Stock Exchange until it was acquired by Delphi Automotive in December 2015. Delphi has since renamed and separated the part of its business that is focused on automated driving and electrification, calling the new entity Aptiv.

== History ==
The company was founded by Paul Hellermann and Jack Bowthorpe in Croydon as Hellermann Electric, a subsidiary of Goodliffe Electric Supplies, in 1938. It moved to a new manufacturing site at Crawley in Sussex in 1948.

In 1964 the company acquired Insuloid Manufacturing, a business which had been founded in 1933 by the Emery family in Hulme, Manchester manufacturing bus-bar insulations. It launched the Tyton system, a method for cable bundling in continuous system, in 1965 and established HellermannTyton Corporation in Milwaukee in 1969. Then in 1976 it expanded into the aviation market, offering cable management products for aeroplanes.

The company established operations at Järfälla in Sweden in 1982, at Hyogo in Japan in 1986 and in Wuxi and in Shanghai in China in 1998. It then began harmonising its branding under the single worldwide trademark HellermannTyton in 1999. After that, in 2000, it established a new plant at Tornesch near Hamburg with 15,000 m^{2} of production and storage space.

The company was sold by its then owners, Spirent, to funds controlled by Doughty Hanson & Co for £289m in 2006. It was then the subject of an initial public offering in March 2013. In September 2013 Doughty Hanson & Co sold a further 20.9% stake in the company for £119.25m.

In July 2015 Delphi Automotive made an offer to buy the company for $1.7 billion. The acquisition was completed on 18 December 2015 and HellermannTyton became constituent part of Aptiv's Engineered Components Group division.

== Origin of name ==
The name HellermannTyton is a Portmanteau of the founders surname, Paul Hellermann, and the 1965 invented "Tyton System", a method for cable bundling in continuous system.

== Operations ==
=== Manufacturing sites ===
Three production facilities are located in the UK (Manchester, Plymouth, Northampton). The others are located in Poland (Kotunia, within Słupca County), France (Trappes), Germany (Tornesch), South Africa (Johannesburg), Singapore (Yishun), China (Wuxi), Japan (Hyogo), Korea (Incheon), USA (Milwaukee), Mexico (General Escobedo) and Brazil (Jundiai).

=== Processed materials ===
The materials processed are usually engineering plastics: PA 6.6 (in different condition, like heat stabilised, UV-resistant, weather resistant, impact modified, glass filled, mineral filled, coloured); PE, PP with different modifications; POM; PA 11, PA 12; PEEK; ETFE (Tefzel); PA 46; other technical thermoplastics; Chloroprene Rubber.

=== Sectors and divisions ===
The company produces for diverse markets and industries including Original equipment manufacturers for passenger cars, rail carriages, aircraft and ships as well as products used in electronics, telecommunication equipment, appliances or on construction sites.

Product sales are categorised into the following segments:

- Electrical: products for Original equipment manufacturers, electrical wholesalers, contractors acting on behalf of diverse end-users, panel builders assembling electrical panels for end-markets, resellers to end-markets such as catalogue companies and sales to the mass transit, defence, alternative energy, products used for application offshore in wind farm and electronics end-markets.
- Automotive: comprises sales to manufacturers of cars, trucks and other heavy vehicles as well as to their suppliers (Tier 1, Tier 2 and Tier 3 suppliers). The company develops and produce customer-specific products such as fastening elements and cable ties especially for the automotive industry, which are used in doors, in the engine compartment (e.g. cables, hoses and lines are held and fastened) and on the entire wiring harness. Another important operating segment of Aptiv is the connected car market.
- Datacom and Other: comprises products for data communication providers requiring secure environments such as data centres and open floor work area applications as well as sales to the other diverse non-cable management end-markets including forestry, agriculture and packaging.

=== New parts development ===
The company develops products based on customer requirements. e.g. custom-made automotive wiring harnesses for passenger cars, for ship and aircraft manufacturers and other industries such as "white goods". Products are designed using design programs, known as CAD systems, in 3D. The designs are produced in a small series of prototypes sent to the customer for installation in vehicles, machinery etc. for testing purposes. After testing the part, corresponding quantities are made using injection moulding.
