= Gołkowo =

Gołkowo or Gółkowo may refer to the following places in Poland:

- Gołkowo, Lower Silesian Voivodeship (south-west Poland)
- Gołkowo, Kuyavian-Pomeranian Voivodeship (north-central Poland)
- Gołkowo, West Pomeranian Voivodeship (north-west Poland)
- Gółkowo, Greater Poland Voivodeship (west-central Poland)
