= Bielawy, Gmina Słupca =

Bielawy
- Village
- Location within Poland
- Coordinates: 52°18′21″N 17°55′5″E
- Country: Poland
- Voivodeship: Greater Poland
- County: Słupca
- Gmina: Słupca
- Population: 60

Bielawy [bjɛˈlavɨ] is a village in the administrative district of Gmina Słupca, within Słupca County, Greater Poland Voivodeship, in west-central Poland.
