= Wola Koszucka-Parcele =

- Village
- Location within Poland
- Coordinates: 52°14′21″N 17°57′29″E
- Country: Poland
- Voivodeship: Greater Poland
- County: Słupca
- Gmina: Słupca

Wola Koszucka-Parcele [ˈvɔla kɔˈʂut͡ska parˈt͡sɛlɛ] is a village in the administrative district of Gmina Słupca, within Słupca County, Greater Poland Voivodeship, in west-central Poland.
