= Róża, Słupca County =

Róża
- Village
- Location within Poland
- Coordinates: 52°18′5″N 17°54′16″E
- Country: Poland
- Voivodeship: Greater Poland
- County: Słupca
- Gmina: Słupca
- Population: 140

Róża [ˈruʐa] is a village in the administrative district of Gmina Słupca, within Słupca County, Greater Poland Voivodeship, in west-central Poland.
