= Kluczewnica =

- Village
- Location within Poland
- Coordinates: 52°16′24″N 17°55′12″E
- Country: Poland
- Voivodeship: Greater Poland
- County: Słupca
- Gmina: Słupca
- Population: 13

Kluczewnica [klut͡ʂɛvˈnit͡sa] is a village in the administrative district of Gmina Słupca, within Słupca County, Greater Poland Voivodeship, in west-central Poland.
