= Samarzewo =

- Village
- Location within Poland
- Coordinates: 52°12′51″N 17°45′22″E
- Country: Poland
- Voivodeship: Greater Poland
- County: Słupca
- Gmina: Lądek

Samarzewo [samaˈʐɛvɔ] is a village in the administrative district of Gmina Lądek, within Słupca County, Greater Poland Voivodeship, in west-central Poland.
