= Nowa Wieś, Gmina Słupca =

Nowa Wieś
- Village
- Location within Poland
- Coordinates: 52°17′55″N 18°1′29″E
- Country: Poland
- Voivodeship: Greater Poland
- County: Słupca
- Gmina: Słupca
- Population: 180

Nowa Wieś [ˈnɔva ˈvjɛɕ] is a village in the administrative district of Gmina Słupca, within Słupca County, Greater Poland Voivodeship, in west-central Poland.
