= Ratyń, Greater Poland Voivodeship =

Ratyń
- Village
- Location within Poland
- Coordinates: 52°12′N 18°0′E
- Country: Poland
- Voivodeship: Greater Poland
- County: Słupca
- Gmina: Lądek

Ratyń [ˈratɨɲ] is a village in the administrative district of Gmina Lądek, within Słupca County, Greater Poland Voivodeship, in west-central Poland.
