= Grabina, Gmina Ostrowite =

Grabina
- Village
- Location within Poland
- Coordinates: 52°19′25″N 18°00′55″E
- Country: Poland
- Voivodeship: Greater Poland
- County: Słupca
- Gmina: Ostrowite

Grabina [ɡraˈbina] is a village in the administrative district of Gmina Ostrowite, within Słupca County, Greater Poland Voivodeship, in west-central Poland.
