= Orchówek, Greater Poland Voivodeship =

Orchówek
- Village
- Location within Poland
- Coordinates: 52°29′4″N 17°59′50″E
- Country: Poland
- Voivodeship: Greater Poland
- County: Słupca
- Gmina: Orchowo
- Population: 120

Orchówek [ɔrˈxuvɛk] is a village in the administrative district of Gmina Orchowo, within Słupca County, Greater Poland Voivodeship, in west-central Poland.
