= Dziedzice, Greater Poland Voivodeship =

Dziedzice
- Village
- Location within Poland
- Coordinates: 52°14′N 17°51′E
- Country: Poland
- Voivodeship: Greater Poland
- County: Słupca
- Gmina: Lądek

Dziedzice [d͡ʑɛˈd͡ʑit͡sɛ] is a village in the administrative district of Gmina Lądek, within Słupca County, Greater Poland Voivodeship, in west-central Poland.
