= Borki, Słupca County =

Borki
- Village
- Location within Poland
- Coordinates: 52°14′53″N 17°51′29″E
- Country: Poland
- Voivodeship: Greater Poland
- County: Słupca
- Gmina: Słupca

Borki [ˈbɔrki] is a village in the administrative district of Gmina Słupca, within Słupca County, Greater Poland Voivodeship, in west-central Poland.
