= Michałowo, Słupca County =

Michałowo
- Village
- Location within Poland
- Coordinates: 52°19′26″N 17°57′58″E
- Country: Poland
- Voivodeship: Greater Poland
- County: Słupca
- Gmina: Słupca

Michałowo [mixaˈwɔvɔ] is a village in the administrative district of Gmina Słupca, within Słupca County, Greater Poland Voivodeship, in west-central Poland.
