= Skrzynka Mała =

- Village
- Location within Poland
- Coordinates: 52°26′14″N 18°0′58″E
- Country: Poland
- Voivodeship: Greater Poland
- County: Słupca
- Gmina: Ostrowite

Skrzynka Mała [ˈskʂɨnka ˈmawa] is a village in the administrative district of Gmina Ostrowite, within Słupca County, Greater Poland Voivodeship, in west-central Poland.
