= Giewartów-Holendry =

- Village
- Location within Poland
- Coordinates: 52°23′08″N 17°58′02″E
- Country: Poland
- Voivodeship: Greater Poland
- County: Słupca
- Gmina: Ostrowite

Giewartów-Holendry [ɡʲɛˈvartuf xɔˈlɛndrɨ] is a village in the administrative district of Gmina Ostrowite, within Słupca County, Greater Poland Voivodeship, in west-central Poland.
