= Sługocin-Kolonia =

- Village
- Location within Poland
- Coordinates: 52°13′11″N 18°00′00″E
- Country: Poland
- Voivodeship: Greater Poland
- County: Słupca
- Gmina: Lądek

Sługocin-Kolonia [swuˈɡɔt͡ɕin kɔˈlɔɲa] is a village in the administrative district of Gmina Lądek, within Słupca County, Greater Poland Voivodeship, in west-central Poland.
