= Marcewo =

- Village
- Location within Poland
- Coordinates: 52°21′N 17°56′E
- Country: Poland
- Voivodeship: Greater Poland
- County: Słupca
- Gmina: Słupca
- Population: 100
- Time zone: UTC+1 (CET)
  - Summer (DST): UTC+2 (CEST)
- Vehicle registration: PSL

Marcewo [marˈt͡sɛvɔ] is a village in the administrative district of Gmina Słupca, within Słupca County, Greater Poland Voivodeship, in west-central Poland.

== History ==
During the German occupation of Poland (World War II), in 1940, the German gendarmerie carried out expulsions of Poles, who were then placed in a transit camp in Łódź, and afterwards deported to the General Government in the more eastern part of German-occupied Poland, while their houses and farms were handed over to German colonists as part of the Lebensraum policy.
