= Kunowo, Słupca County =

Kunowo
- Settlement
- Location within Poland
- Coordinates: 52°14′59″N 17°58′41″E
- Country: Poland
- Voivodeship: Greater Poland
- County: Słupca
- Gmina: Słupca
- Population: 8

Kunowo [kuˈnɔvɔ] is a settlement in the administrative district of Gmina Słupca, within Słupca County, Greater Poland Voivodeship, in west-central Poland.
