= Dąbrowa, Słupca County =

Dąbrowa
- Village
- Location within Poland
- Coordinates: 52°13′52″N 17°46′59″E
- Country: Poland
- Voivodeship: Greater Poland
- County: Słupca
- Gmina: Lądek

Dąbrowa [dɔmˈbrɔva] is a village in the administrative district of Gmina Lądek, within Słupca County, Greater Poland Voivodeship, in west-central Poland.
