= Żelazków, Słupca County =

Żelazków
- Village
- Location within Poland
- Coordinates: 52°18′N 17°58′E
- Country: Poland
- Voivodeship: Greater Poland
- County: Słupca
- Gmina: Słupca

Żelazków [ʐɛˈlaskuf] is a village in the administrative district of Gmina Słupca, within Słupca County, Greater Poland Voivodeship, in west-central Poland.
