= Młodojewo-Parcele =

- Village
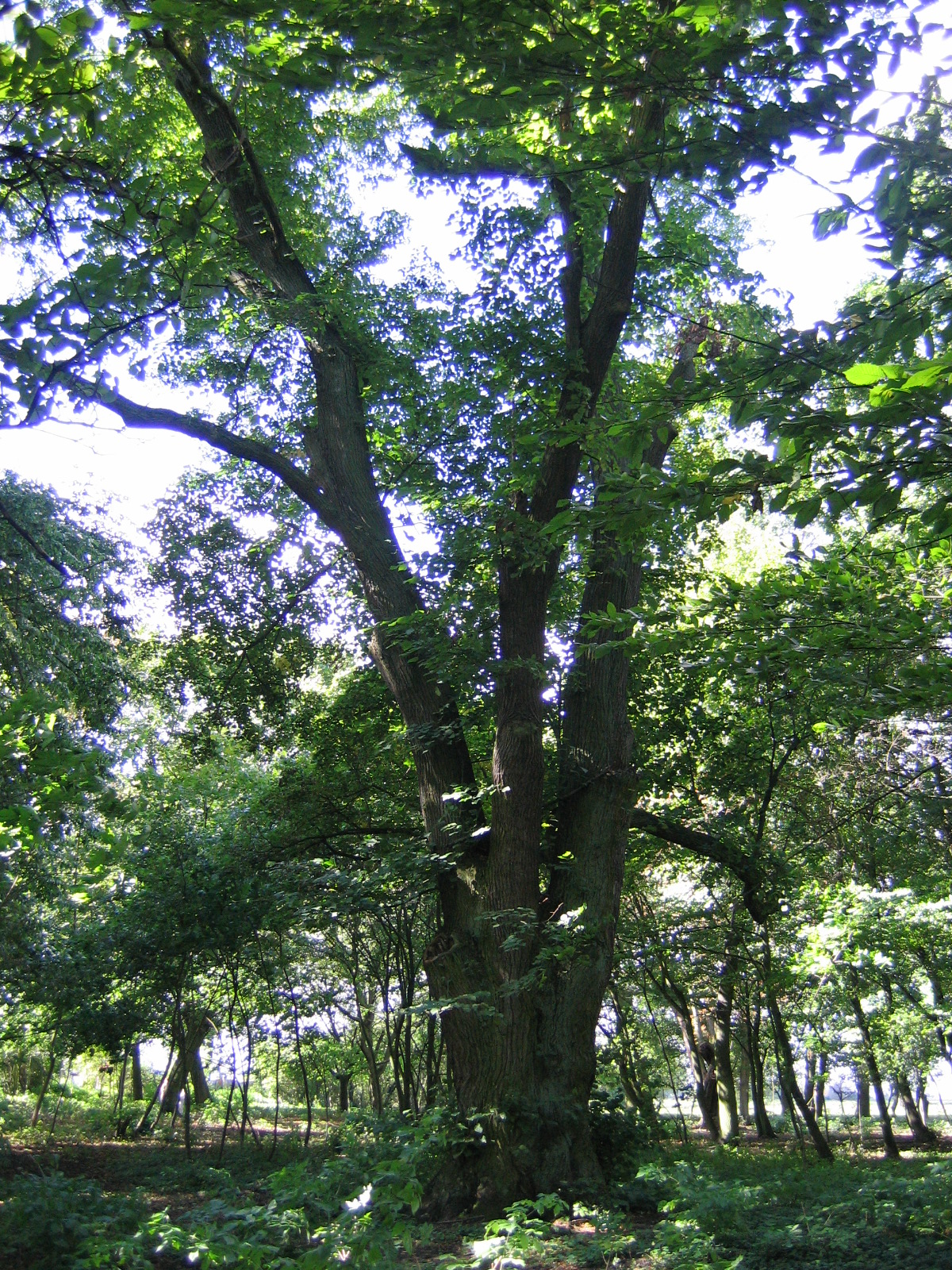
- Park in Młodojewo-Parcele

- Location within Poland
- Coordinates: 52°18′08″N 17°56′33″E
- Country: Poland
- Voivodeship: Greater Poland
- County: Słupca
- Gmina: Słupca

Młodojewo-Parcele [mwɔdɔˈjɛvɔ parˈt͡sɛlɛ] is a village in the administrative district of Gmina Słupca, within Słupca County, Greater Poland Voivodeship, in west-central Poland.
