= Cienin-Perze =

- Village
- Location within Poland
- Coordinates: 52°15′32″N 17°59′33″E
- Country: Poland
- Voivodeship: Greater Poland
- County: Słupca
- Gmina: Słupca
- Population: 152

Cienin-Perze [ˈt͡ɕɛnin ˈpɛʐɛ] is a village in the administrative district of Gmina Słupca, within Słupca County, Greater Poland Voivodeship, in west-central Poland.
