= Sergiejewo =

- Village
- Location within Poland
- Country: Poland
- Voivodeship: Greater Poland
- County: Słupca
- Gmina: Słupca
- Population: 28

Sergiejewo [sɛrɡʲɛˈjɛvɔ] is a village in the administrative district of Gmina Słupca, within Słupca County, Greater Poland Voivodeship, in west-central Poland.
