= Nakielec =

- Village
- Location within Poland
- Coordinates: 52°14′20″N 17°59′00″E
- Country: Poland
- Voivodeship: Greater Poland
- County: Słupca
- Gmina: Lądek

Nakielec [naˈkʲɛlɛt͡s] is a village in the administrative district of Gmina Lądek, within Słupca County, Greater Poland Voivodeship, in west-central Poland.
