= Cienin-Kolonia =

- Village
- Location within Poland
- Coordinates: 52°16′22″N 18°01′22″E
- Country: Poland
- Voivodeship: Greater Poland
- County: Słupca
- Gmina: Słupca

Cienin-Kolonia [ˈt͡ɕɛnin kɔˈlɔɲa] is a village in the administrative district of Gmina Słupca, within Słupca County, Greater Poland Voivodeship, in west-central Poland.
