= Anastazewo =

- Village
- Location within Poland
- Coordinates: 52°27′N 18°2′E
- Country: Poland
- Voivodeship: Greater Poland
- County: Słupca
- Gmina: Powidz
- Population: 120

Anastazewo [anastaˈzɛvɔ] is a village in the administrative district of Gmina Powidz, within Słupca County, Greater Poland Voivodeship, in west-central Poland.
