= Ciążeń-Holendry =

- Village
- Location within Poland
- Coordinates: 52°11′49″N 17°50′39″E
- Country: Poland
- Voivodeship: Greater Poland
- County: Słupca
- Gmina: Lądek

Ciążeń-Holendry [ˈt͡ɕɔ̃ʐɛɲ xɔˈlɛndrɨ] is a village in the administrative district of Gmina Lądek, within Słupca County, Greater Poland Voivodeship, in west-central Poland.
