= Marcewek =

- Village
- Location within Poland
- Coordinates: 52°20′N 17°59′E
- Country: Poland
- Voivodeship: Greater Poland
- County: Słupca
- Gmina: Słupca
- Population (approx.): 190

Marcewek [marˈt͡sɛvɛk] is a village in the administrative district of Gmina Słupca, within Słupca County, Greater Poland Voivodeship, in west-central Poland.

The village has an approximate population of 190.
