= Głucha Puszcza =

- Village
- Location within Poland
- Coordinates: 52°29′53″N 17°59′46″E
- Country: Poland
- Voivodeship: Greater Poland
- County: Słupca
- Gmina: Orchowo

Głucha Puszcza [ˈɡwuxa ˈpuʂt͡ʂa] is a village in the administrative district of Gmina Orchowo, within Słupca County, Greater Poland Voivodeship, in west-central Poland.
