= Linowiec, Greater Poland Voivodeship =

Linowiec
- Village
- Location within Poland
- Coordinates: 52°30′27″N 18°5′13″E
- Country: Poland
- Voivodeship: Greater Poland
- County: Słupca
- Gmina: Orchowo

Linowiec [liˈnɔvjɛt͡s] is a village in the administrative district of Gmina Orchowo, within Słupca County, Greater Poland Voivodeship, in west-central Poland.
