= Podlesie, Słupca County =

Podlesie
- Settlement
- Location within Poland
- Coordinates: 52°29′34″N 17°59′06″E
- Country: Poland
- Voivodeship: Greater Poland
- County: Słupca
- Gmina: Orchowo

Podlesie [pɔdˈlɛɕɛ] is a settlement in the administrative district of Gmina Orchowo, within Słupca County, Greater Poland Voivodeship, in west-central Poland.
