= Smolniki Powidzkie =

- Village
- Location within Poland
- Coordinates: 52°28′N 18°0′E
- Country: Poland
- Voivodeship: Greater Poland
- County: Słupca
- Gmina: Powidz

Smolniki Powidzkie [smɔlˈniki pɔˈvit͡skʲɛ] is a village in the administrative district of Gmina Powidz, within Słupca County, Greater Poland Voivodeship, in west-central Poland.
