= Różanna, Greater Poland Voivodeship =

Różanna
- Village
- Location within Poland
- Coordinates: 52°32′48″N 18°01′18″E
- Country: Poland
- Voivodeship: Greater Poland
- County: Słupca
- Gmina: Orchowo

Różanna [ruˈʐanna] is a village in the administrative district of Gmina Orchowo, within Słupca County, Greater Poland Voivodeship, in west-central Poland.
