= Zaborze, Greater Poland Voivodeship =

Zaborze
- Village
- Location within Poland
- Coordinates: 52°18′43″N 18°2′24″E
- Country: Poland
- Voivodeship: Greater Poland
- County: Słupca
- Gmina: Słupca

Zaborze [zaˈbɔʐɛ] is a village in the administrative district of Gmina Słupca, within Słupca County, Greater Poland Voivodeship, in west-central Poland.
