= Jaroszyn-Kolonia =

- Village
- Location within Poland
- Coordinates: 52°13′41″N 17°52′19″E
- Country: Poland
- Voivodeship: Greater Poland
- County: Słupca
- Gmina: Lądek

Jaroszyn-Kolonia [jaˈrɔʂɨn kɔˈlɔɲa] is a village in the administrative district of Gmina Lądek, within Słupca County, Greater Poland Voivodeship, in west-central Poland.
