= Kamień, Słupca County =

Kamień
- Village
- Location within Poland
- Coordinates: 52°17′N 18°1′E
- Country: Poland
- Voivodeship: Greater Poland
- County: Słupca
- Gmina: Słupca
- Website: http://kamien.gmina.slupca.w.interia.pl

Kamień (Polish pronunciation: [ˈkamjɛj̃]) is a village in the administrative district of Gmina Słupca, within Słupca County, Greater Poland Voivodeship, in west-central Poland.
