= Ługi, Słupca County =

Ługi
- Settlement
- Location within Poland
- Coordinates: 52°25′N 17°51′E
- Country: Poland
- Voivodeship: Greater Poland
- County: Słupca
- Gmina: Powidz

Ługi [ˈwuɡi] is a settlement in the administrative district of Gmina Powidz, within Słupca County, Greater Poland Voivodeship, in west-central Poland.
