= Charbin, Poland =

Charbin
- Village
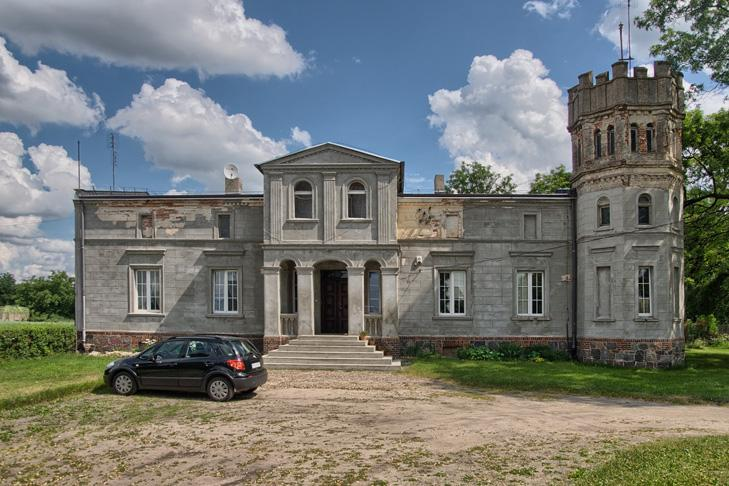

- Location within Poland
- Coordinates: 52°25′43″N 17°53′12″E
- Country: Poland
- Voivodeship: Greater Poland
- County: Słupca
- Gmina: Powidz

Charbin [ˈxarbin] is a village in the administrative district of Gmina Powidz, within Słupca County, Greater Poland Voivodeship, in west-central Poland.
