= Kinno =

- Village
- Location within Poland
- Coordinates: 52°29′36″N 17°54′48″E
- Country: Poland
- Voivodeship: Greater Poland
- County: Słupca
- Gmina: Orchowo

Kinno [ˈkinnɔ] is a village in the administrative district of Gmina Orchowo, within Słupca County, Greater Poland Voivodeship, in west-central Poland.
