= Kosakowo =

Kosakowo may refer to the following places:

- Kosakowo, Greater Poland Voivodeship (west-central Poland)
- Kosakowo, Pomeranian Voivodeship (north Poland)
- Kosakowo, Warmian-Masurian Voivodeship (north Poland)
