= Gostun (disambiguation) =

Gostun may refer to:

- Gostun, a Bulgarian ruler
- Gostun, Bulgaria in Blagoevgrad Province, Bulgaria
- Gostun, Serbia in Serbia
- Gostuń in Poland
