= Szydłowiec (disambiguation) =

Szydłowiec may refer to the following places:

- Szydłowiec, Greater Poland Voivodeship (west-central Poland)
- Szydłowiec in Masovian Voivodeship (east-central Poland)
- Szydłowiec, Subcarpathian Voivodeship (south-east Poland)
- Szydłowiec Śląski (southern Poland)
