= Cienin Zaborny-Parcele =

- Village
- Location within Poland
- Coordinates: 52°15′54″N 17°58′15″E
- Country: Poland
- Voivodeship: Greater Poland
- County: Słupca
- Gmina: Słupca
- Population: 401

Cienin Zaborny-Parcele [ˈt͡ɕɛnin zaˈbɔrnɨ parˈt͡sɛlɛ] is a village in the administrative district of Gmina Słupca, within Słupca County, Greater Poland Voivodeship, in west-central Poland.
