= Gałczynek =

- Village
- Location within Poland
- Coordinates: 52°30′N 17°58′E
- Country: Poland
- Voivodeship: Greater Poland
- County: Słupca
- Gmina: Orchowo

Gałczynek [ɡau̯ˈt͡ʂɨnɛk] is a village in the administrative district of Gmina Orchowo, within Słupca County, Greater Poland Voivodeship, in west-central Poland.
