= Piotrowo, Słupca County =

Piotrowo
- Village
- Location within Poland
- Coordinates: 52°13′40″N 17°58′50″E
- Country: Poland
- Voivodeship: Greater Poland
- County: Słupca
- Gmina: Lądek
- Population: 80

Piotrowo [pjɔˈtrɔvɔ] is a village in the administrative district of Gmina Lądek, within Słupca County, Greater Poland Voivodeship, in west-central Poland.

The village has a population of 80.
