= Ostrowo, Słupca County =

Ostrowo
- Village
- Location within Poland
- Coordinates: 52°27′N 17°58′E
- Country: Poland
- Voivodeship: Greater Poland
- County: Słupca
- Gmina: Powidz
- Population: 140

Ostrowo [ɔsˈtrɔvɔ] is a village in the administrative district of Gmina Powidz, within Słupca County, Greater Poland Voivodeship, in west-central Poland.
