= Jaworowo, Słupca County =

Jaworowo
- Settlement
- Location within Poland
- Coordinates: 52°18′48″N 17°55′35″E
- Country: Poland
- Voivodeship: Greater Poland
- County: Słupca
- Gmina: Słupca

Jaworowo [javɔˈrɔvɔ] is a settlement in the administrative district of Gmina Słupca, within Słupca County, Greater Poland Voivodeship, in west-central Poland.
