= Mlecze =

- Village
- Location within Poland
- Coordinates: 52°30′02″N 18°07′09″E
- Country: Poland
- Voivodeship: Greater Poland
- County: Słupca
- Gmina: Orchowo

Mlecze [ˈmlɛt͡ʂɛ] is a village in the administrative district of Gmina Orchowo, within Słupca County, Greater Poland Voivodeship, in west-central Poland.
