= Wacławów =

Wacławów may refer to the following places:

- Wacławów, Piotrków County in Łódź Voivodeship (central Poland)
- Wacławów, Sieradz County in Łódź Voivodeship (central Poland)
- Wacławów, Radom County in Masovian Voivodeship (east-central Poland)
- Wacławów, Zwoleń County in Masovian Voivodeship (east-central Poland)
- Wacławów, Greater Poland Voivodeship (west-central Poland)
