= Zacisze, Słupca County =

Zacisze
- Village
- Location within Poland
- Coordinates: 52°18′14″N 18°01′51″E
- Country: Poland
- Voivodeship: Greater Poland
- County: Słupca
- Gmina: Słupca
- Population: 51

Zacisze [zaˈt͡ɕiʂɛ] is a village in the administrative district of Gmina Słupca, within Słupca County, Greater Poland Voivodeship, in west-central Poland.
