= Kania, Słupca County =

Kania
- Village
- Location within Poland
- Coordinates: 52°26′N 18°3′E
- Country: Poland
- Voivodeship: Greater Poland
- County: Słupca
- Gmina: Ostrowite

Kania [ˈkaɲa] is a village in the administrative district of Gmina Ostrowite, within Słupca County, Greater Poland Voivodeship, in west-central Poland.
