= Kowalewo Opactwo-Parcele =

- Village
- Location within Poland
- Coordinates: 52°15′01″N 17°56′17″E
- Country: Poland
- Voivodeship: Greater Poland
- County: Słupca
- Gmina: Słupca
- Population: 125

Kowalewo Opactwo-Parcele [kɔvaˈlɛvɔ ɔˈpat͡stfɔ parˈt͡sɛlɛ] is a village in the administrative district of Gmina Słupca, within Słupca County, Greater Poland Voivodeship, in west-central Poland.
