= Ląd-Kolonia =

- Village
- Location within Poland
- Coordinates: 52°13′23″N 17°53′32″E
- Country: Poland
- Voivodeship: Greater Poland
- County: Słupca
- Gmina: Lądek

Ląd-Kolonia [ˈlɔnt kɔˈlɔɲa] is a village in the administrative district of Gmina Lądek, within Słupca County, Greater Poland Voivodeship, in west-central Poland.
