= Grzeszczak =

Grzeszczak is a Polish surname. Notable people with the surname include:

- Eugeniusz Grzeszczak (born 1954), Polish politician
- Robert Grzeszczak (born 1971), Polish field hockey player
- Sylwia Grzeszczak (born 1989), Polish singer-songwriter and pianist
