= Giewartów =

- Village
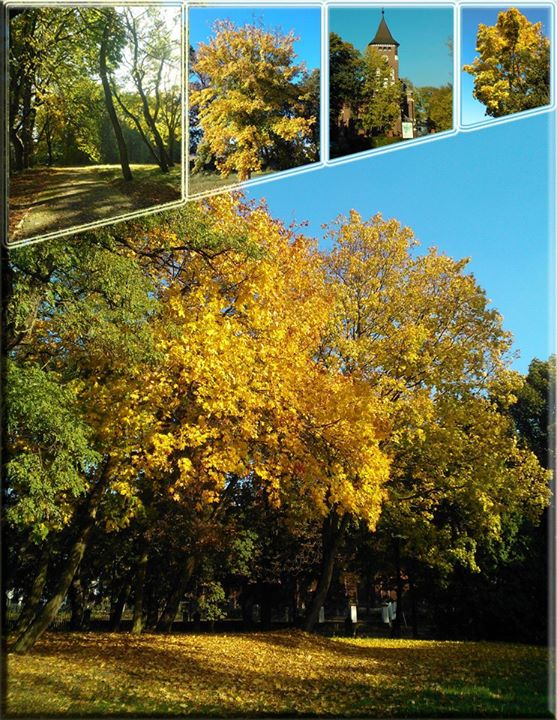
- City Park

- Location within Poland
- Coordinates: 52°23′N 17°57′E
- Country: Poland
- Voivodeship: Greater Poland
- County: Słupca
- Gmina: Ostrowite
- Time zone: UTC+1 (CET)
  - Summer (DST): UTC+2 (CEST)
- Postal code: 62-402
- Area code: +48 063
- Website: Giewartów

Giewartów [ɡʲɛˈvartuf] is a village in the administrative district of Gmina Ostrowite, within Słupca County, Greater Poland Voivodeship, in west-central Poland.
