= Rokosz, Greater Poland Voivodeship =

Rokosz
- Village
- Location within Poland
- Coordinates: 52°15′19″N 17°57′13″E
- Country: Poland
- Voivodeship: Greater Poland
- County: Słupca
- Gmina: Słupca
- Population: 60

Rokosz [ˈrɔkɔʂ] is a village in the administrative district of Gmina Słupca, within Słupca County, Greater Poland Voivodeship, in west-central Poland.
