= Rękawczynek =

- Village
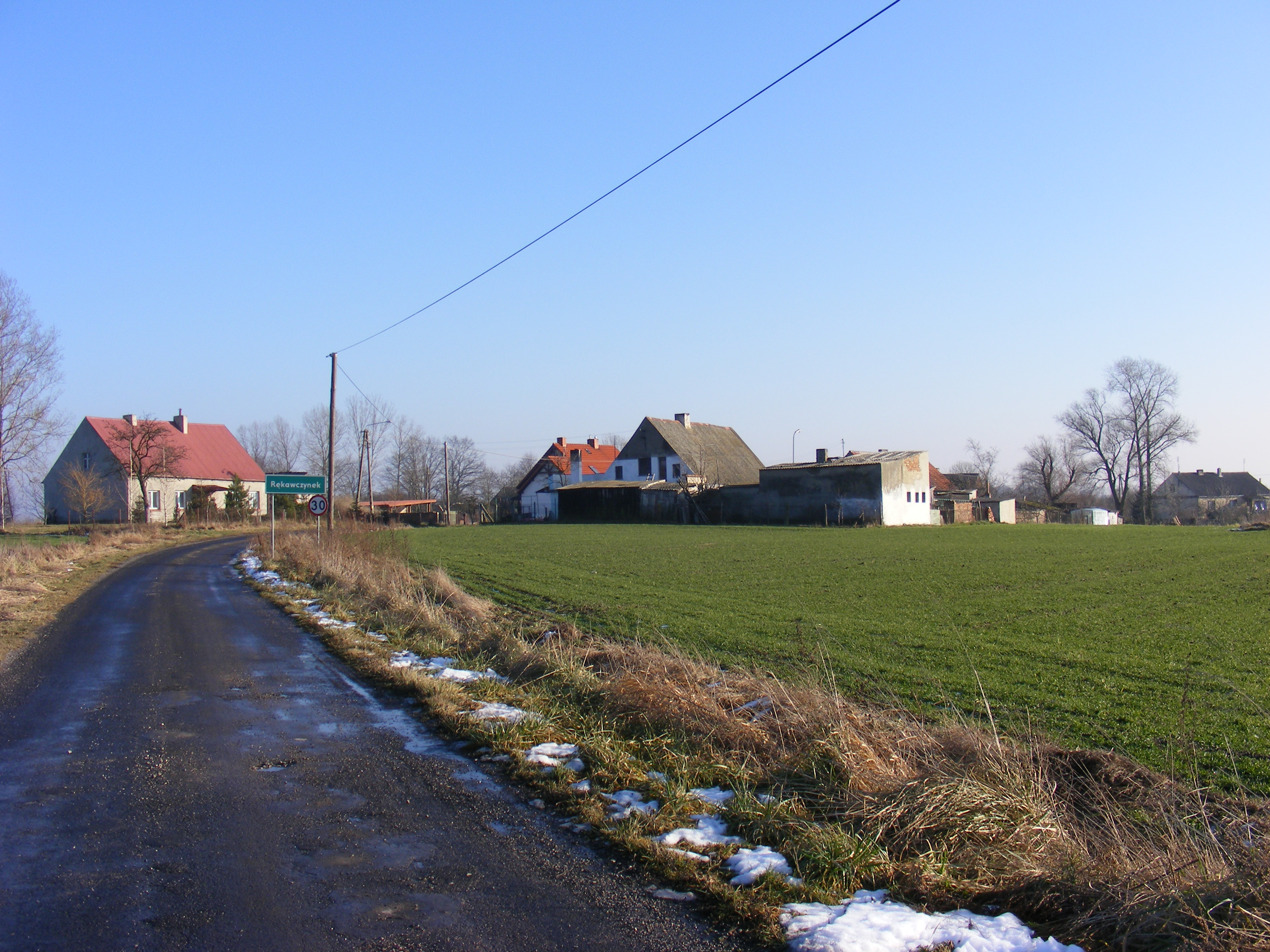
- View from the south-west

- Location within Poland
- Coordinates: 52°31′47″N 18°0′11″E
- Country: Poland
- Voivodeship: Greater Poland
- County: Słupca
- Gmina: Orchowo
- Population: 80

Rękawczynek [rɛnkafˈt͡ʂɨnɛk] is a village in the administrative district of Gmina Orchowo, within Słupca County, Greater Poland Voivodeship, in west-central Poland.
