= Czesławowo =

- Village
- Location within Poland
- Coordinates: 52°18′39″N 17°58′33″E
- Country: Poland
- Voivodeship: Greater Poland
- County: Słupca
- Gmina: Słupca
- Population: 30

Czesławowo (Polish pronunciation: [t͡ʂɛswaˈvɔvɔ]) is a village in the administrative district of Gmina Słupca, within Słupca County, Greater Poland Voivodeship, in west-central Poland.
