= Przecław, Słupca County =

Przecław
- Village
- Location within Poland
- Coordinates: 52°22′N 18°3′E
- Country: Poland
- Voivodeship: Greater Poland
- County: Słupca
- Gmina: Ostrowite

Przecław [ˈpʂɛt͡swaf] is a village in the administrative district of Gmina Ostrowite, within Słupca County, Greater Poland Voivodeship, in west-central Poland.
