= Cienin Kościelny =

- Village
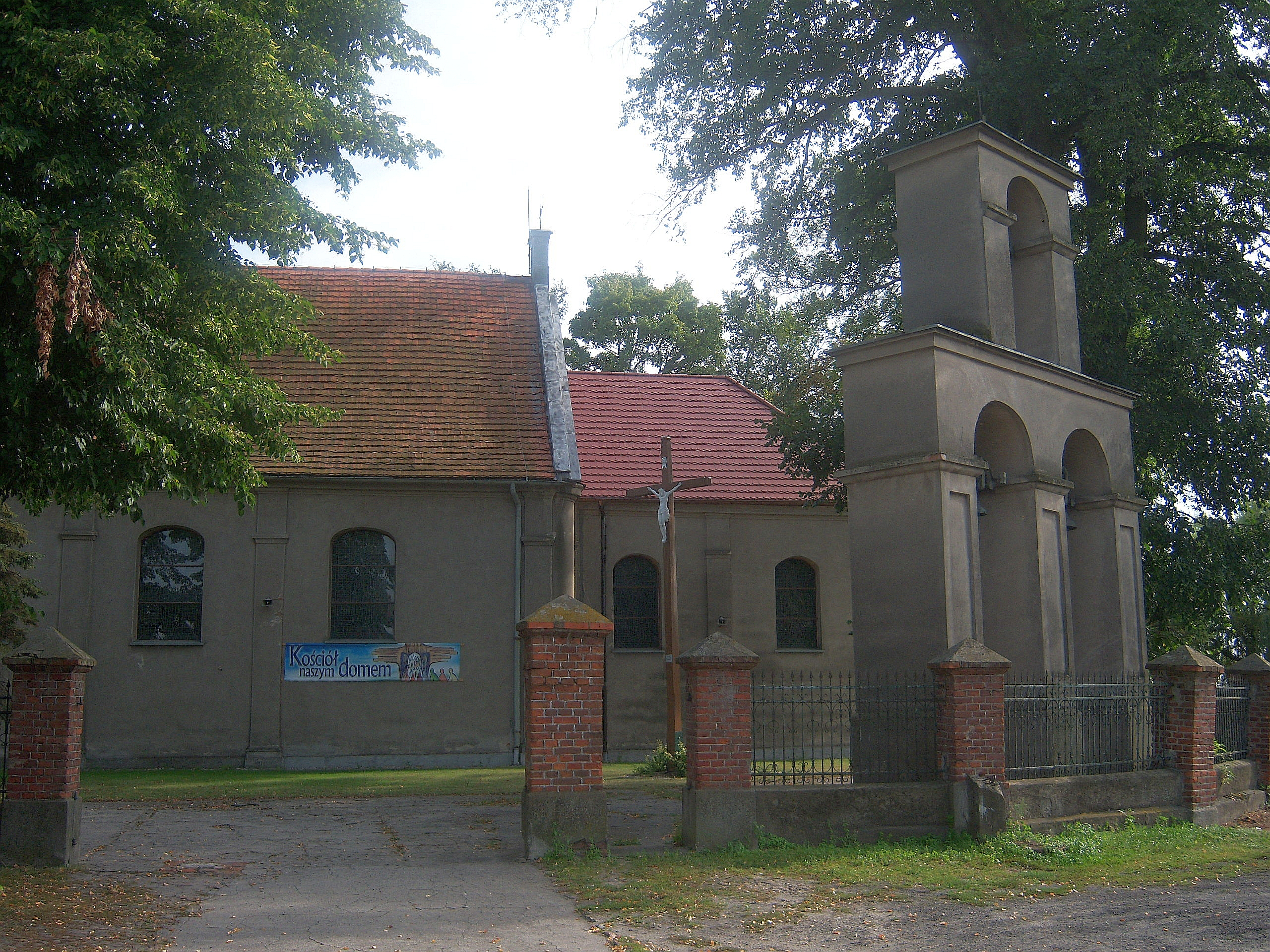
- Church of Saint Catherine of Alexandria

- Location within Poland
- Coordinates: 52°15′54″N 18°00′36″E
- Country: Poland
- Voivodeship: Greater Poland
- County: Słupca
- Gmina: Słupca

Cienin Kościelny [ˈt͡ɕɛnin kɔɕˈt͡ɕɛlnɨ] is a village in the administrative district of Gmina Słupca, within Słupca County, Greater Poland Voivodeship, in west-central Poland.
