= Piotrowice-Parcele =

- Settlement
- Location within Poland
- Coordinates: 52°21′8″N 17°55′16″E
- Country: Poland
- Voivodeship: Greater Poland
- County: Słupca
- Gmina: Słupca

Piotrowice-Parcele [pjɔtrɔˈvit͡sɛ parˈt͡sɛlɛ] is a settlement in the administrative district of Gmina Słupca, within Słupca County, Greater Poland Voivodeship, in west-central Poland.
