= Jaroszyn, Greater Poland Voivodeship =

Jaroszyn
- Village
- Location within Poland
- Coordinates: 52°13′N 17°53′E
- Country: Poland
- Voivodeship: Greater Poland
- County: Słupca
- Gmina: Lądek
- Population: 250

Jaroszyn [jaˈrɔʂɨn] is a village in the administrative district of Gmina Lądek, within Słupca County, Greater Poland Voivodeship, in west-central Poland.
