= Grobla, Greater Poland Voivodeship =

Grobla
- Village
- Location within Poland
- Coordinates: 52°17′15″N 17°54′11″E
- Country: Poland
- Voivodeship: Greater Poland
- County: Słupca
- Gmina: Słupca

Grobla [ˈɡrɔbla] is a village in the administrative district of Gmina Słupca, within Słupca County, Greater Poland Voivodeship, in west-central Poland.
