= Świnna, Greater Poland Voivodeship =

Świnna
- Village
- Location within Poland
- Coordinates: 52°23′04″N 18°01′05″E
- Country: Poland
- Voivodeship: Greater Poland
- County: Słupca
- Gmina: Ostrowite

Świnna [ˈɕfinna] is a village in the administrative district of Gmina Ostrowite, within Słupca County, Greater Poland Voivodeship, in west-central Poland.
