= Kowalewo-Góry =

- Village
- Location within Poland
- Coordinates: 52°16′07″N 17°55′13″E
- Country: Poland
- Voivodeship: Greater Poland
- County: Słupca
- Gmina: Słupca

Kowalewo-Góry [kɔvaˈlɛvɔ ˈɡurɨ] is a village in the administrative district of Gmina Słupca, within Słupca County, Greater Poland Voivodeship, in west-central Poland.
