= Podbielsko =

- Village
- Location within Poland
- Coordinates: 52°32′N 18°5′E
- Country: Poland
- Voivodeship: Greater Poland
- County: Słupca
- Gmina: Orchowo

Podbielsko [pɔdˈbjɛlskɔ] is a village in the administrative district of Gmina Orchowo, within Słupca County, Greater Poland Voivodeship, in west-central Poland.
