= Czerwonka, Słupca County =

Czerwonka
- Settlement
- Location within Poland
- Coordinates: 52°14′07″N 17°49′32″E
- Country: Poland
- Voivodeship: Greater Poland
- County: Słupca
- Gmina: Słupca
- Population: 13

Czerwonka [t͡ʂɛrˈvɔnka] is a settlement in the administrative district of Gmina Słupca, within Słupca County, Greater Poland Voivodeship, in west-central Poland.
