= Poniatówek, Greater Poland Voivodeship =

Poniatówek
- Village
- Location within Poland
- Coordinates: 52°15′40″N 17°54′40″E
- Country: Poland
- Voivodeship: Greater Poland
- County: Słupca
- Gmina: Słupca

Poniatówek [pɔɲaˈtuvɛk] is a village in the administrative district of Gmina Słupca, within Słupca County, Greater Poland Voivodeship, in west-central Poland.
