= Wola Koszucka =

- Village
- Location within Poland
- Coordinates: 52°14′N 17°57′E
- Country: Poland
- Voivodeship: Greater Poland
- County: Słupca
- Gmina: Lądek

Wola Koszucka [ˈvɔla kɔˈʂut͡ska] is a village in the administrative district of Gmina Lądek, within Słupca County, Greater Poland Voivodeship, in west-central Poland.
