= Polanowo, Słupca County =

Polanowo
- Village
- Location within Poland
- Coordinates: 52°24′N 17°56′E
- Country: Poland
- Voivodeship: Greater Poland
- County: Słupca
- Gmina: Powidz
- Population: 60

Polanowo [pɔlaˈnɔvɔ] is a village in the administrative district of Gmina Powidz, within Słupca County, Greater Poland Voivodeship, in west-central Poland.
