= Doły, Słupca County =

Doły
- Village
- Location within Poland
- Coordinates: 52°21′N 18°0′E
- Country: Poland
- Voivodeship: Greater Poland
- County: Słupca
- Gmina: Ostrowite

Doły [ˈdɔwɨ] is a village in the administrative district of Gmina Ostrowite, within Słupca County, Greater Poland Voivodeship, in west-central Poland.
