= Myślątkowo =

- Village
- Location within Poland
- Coordinates: 52°31′38″N 18°01′04″E
- Country: Poland
- Voivodeship: Greater Poland
- County: Słupca
- Gmina: Orchowo
- Website: http://www.orchowo.pl

Myślątkowo [mɨɕlɔntˈkɔvɔ] is a village in the administrative district of Gmina Orchowo, within Słupca County, Greater Poland Voivodeship, in west-central Poland.
