= Kowalewo Opactwo-Wieś =

- Village
- Location within Poland
- Coordinates: 52°14′52″N 17°55′02″E
- Country: Poland
- Voivodeship: Greater Poland
- County: Słupca
- Gmina: Słupca
- Population: 100

Kowalewo Opactwo-Wieś [kɔvaˈlɛvɔ ɔˈpat͡stfɔ ˈvjɛɕ] is a village in the administrative district of Gmina Słupca, within Słupca County, Greater Poland Voivodeship, in west-central Poland.
