= Ciążeń =

- Village
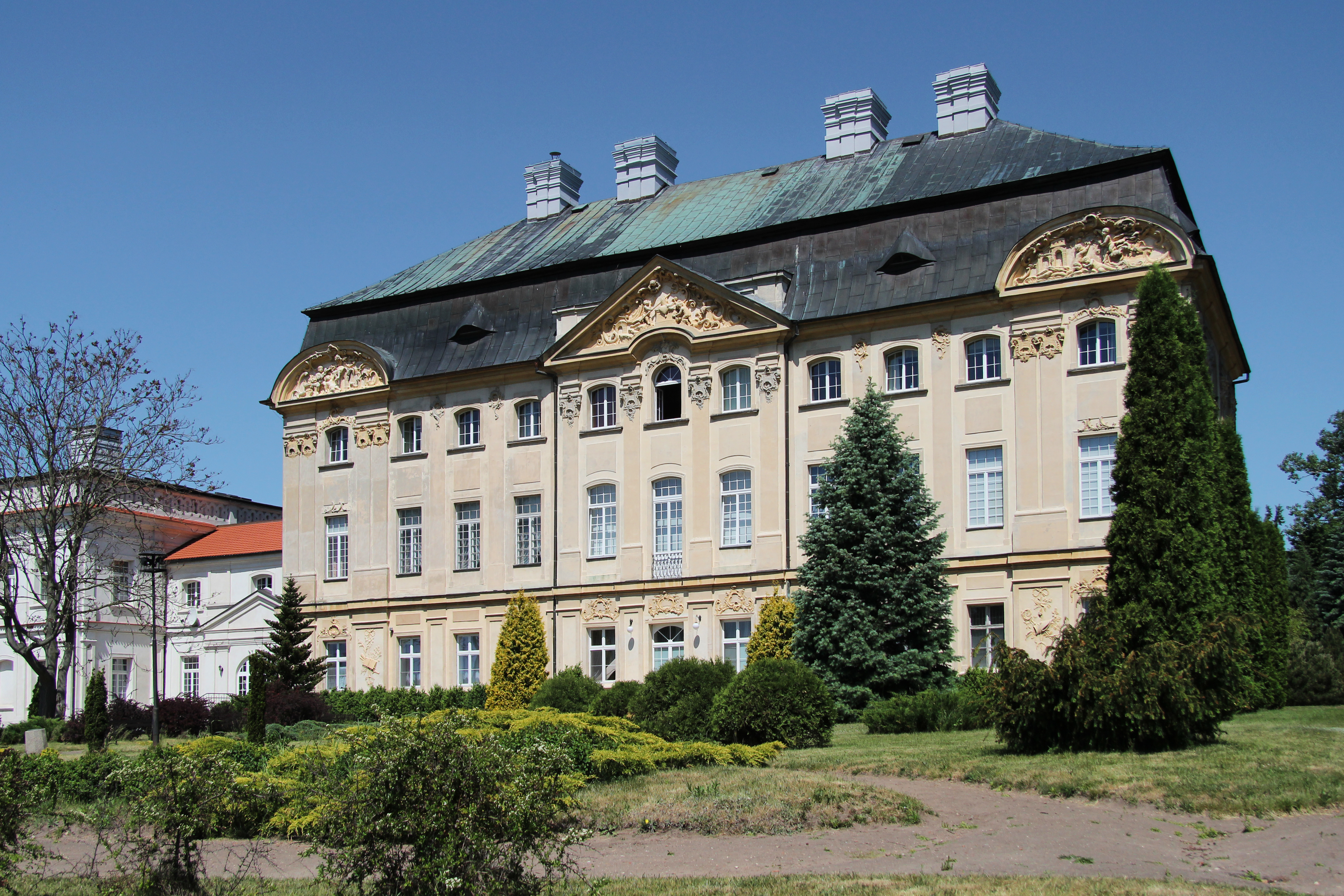
- Bishop's Palace

- Location within Poland
- Coordinates: 52°13′N 17°49′E
- Country: Poland
- Voivodeship: Greater Poland
- County: Słupca
- Gmina: Lądek
- Population: 1,300

Ciążeń [ˈt͡ɕɔ̃ʐɛɲ] is a village in the administrative district of Gmina Lądek, within Słupca County, Greater Poland Voivodeship, in west-central Poland.
