= Mieczownica =

- Village
- Location within Poland
- Coordinates: 52°22′N 17°58′E
- Country: Poland
- Voivodeship: Greater Poland
- County: Słupca
- Gmina: Ostrowite

Mieczownica [mjɛt͡ʂɔvˈnit͡sa] is a village in the administrative district of Gmina Ostrowite, within Słupca County, Greater Poland Voivodeship, in west-central Poland.
