= Bielsko, Słupca County =

Bielsko
- Village
- Location within Poland
- Coordinates: 52°32′7″N 18°4′58″E
- Country: Poland
- Voivodeship: Greater Poland
- County: Słupca
- Gmina: Orchowo

Bielsko [ˈbjɛlskɔ] is a village in the administrative district of Gmina Orchowo, within Słupca County, Greater Poland Voivodeship, in west-central Poland.
