= Policko, Greater Poland Voivodeship =

Policko
- Village
- Location within Poland
- Coordinates: 52°12′N 17°52′E
- Country: Poland
- Voivodeship: Greater Poland
- County: Słupca
- Gmina: Lądek

Policko [pɔˈlit͡skɔ] is a village in the administrative district of Gmina Lądek, within Słupca County, Greater Poland Voivodeship, in west-central Poland.
