= Niezgoda =

Niezgoda is a Polish placename and surname. It may refer to:

- Niezgoda, Lower Silesian Voivodeship (south-west Poland)
- Niezgoda, Greater Poland Voivodeship (west-central Poland)
- Jarosław Niezgoda (born 1995), Polish footballer
