= Posada, Słupca County =

Posada
- Village
- Location within Poland
- Coordinates: 52°22′N 17°54′E
- Country: Poland
- Voivodeship: Greater Poland
- County: Słupca
- Gmina: Słupca

Posada [pɔˈsada] is a village in the administrative district of Gmina Słupca, within Słupca County, Greater Poland Voivodeship, in west-central Poland.
