= Warta Landscape Park =

Protected area in Poland

Coordinates: 52.2000°N 17.9000°E

- Nadwarciański Park Krajobrazowy
- IUCN category V (protected landscape/seascape)
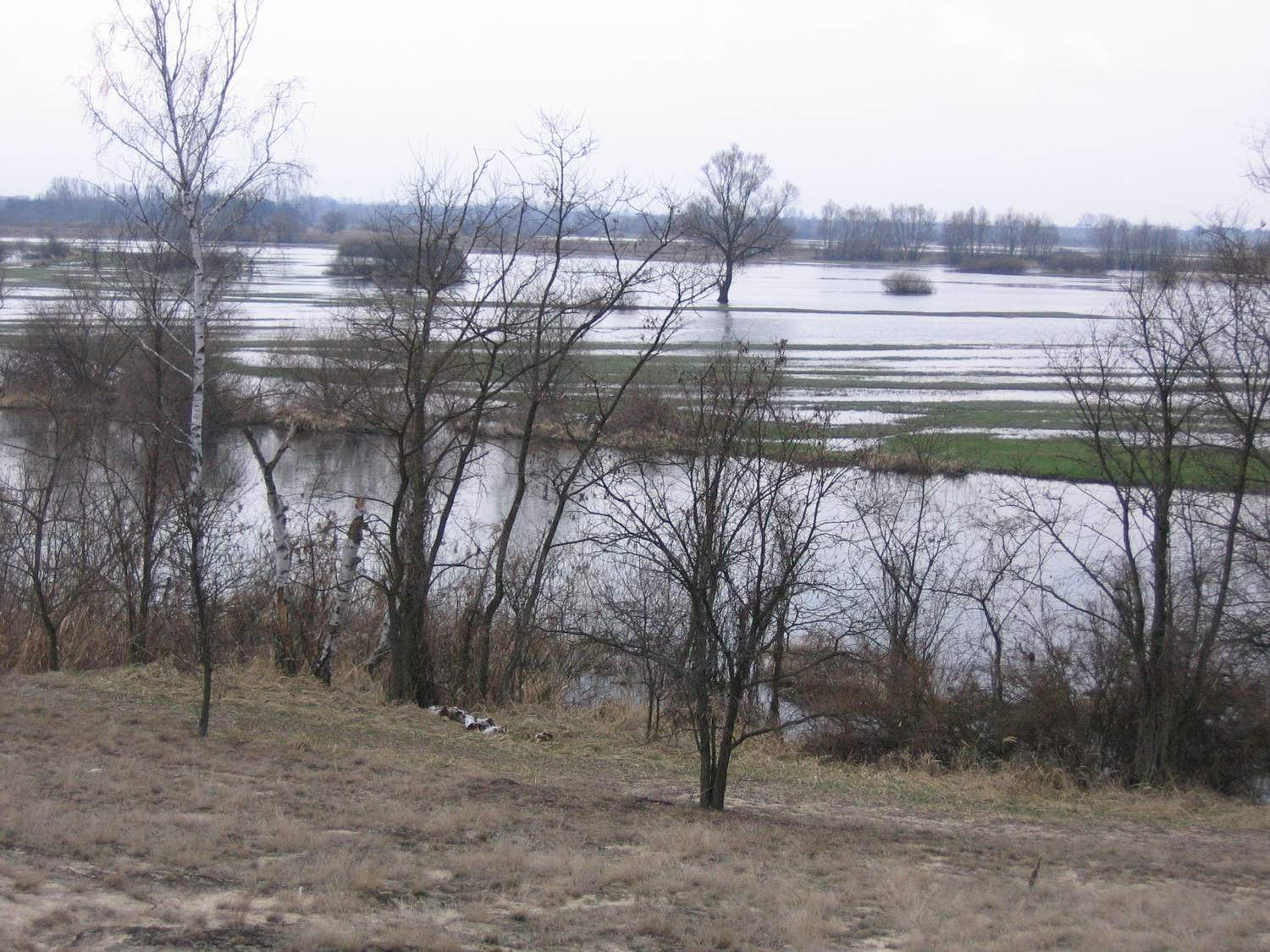
- Interactive map of Warta Landscape Park
- Location: Greater Poland Voivodeship
- Area: 134.28 km^{2} (51.85 sq mi)
- Established: 1995

Warta Landscape Park (Nadwarciański Park Krajobrazowy) is a protected area (Landscape Park) in west-central Poland, established in 1995, covering an area of 134.28 square kilometres (51.85 sq mi) along a stretch of the Warta river west of Konin.

The Park lies within Greater Poland Voivodeship: in Słupca County (Gmina Lądek, Gmina Zagórów), Konin County (Gmina Rzgów) and Września County (Gmina Pyzdry).

== Forms of nature protection ==
The area of Nadwarciański Landscape Park is almost entirely within the area of Natura 2000: the Special Bird Protection Area of the Middle Warta Valley and the Special Protection Area of the Ostoja Nadwarciańska habitats. The area of the Park is also within the Pyzdry Protected Landscape Area. In the Lądek commune, situated in the Nadwarciański Landscape Park, there is an unnamed ecological site with an area of 312 ha.
