= Przybrodzin =

- Village
- Location within Poland
- Coordinates: 52°26′N 17°56′E
- Country: Poland
- Voivodeship: Greater Poland
- County: Słupca
- Gmina: Powidz
- Website: noclegi.win.pl

Przybrodzin [pʂɨˈbrɔd͡ʑin] (German 1939–1945 Imsee) is a village in the administrative district of Gmina Powidz, within Słupca County, Greater Poland Voivodeship, in west-central Poland.
