= Gmina Lądek =

Gmina Lądek Lądek Commune
- Gmina
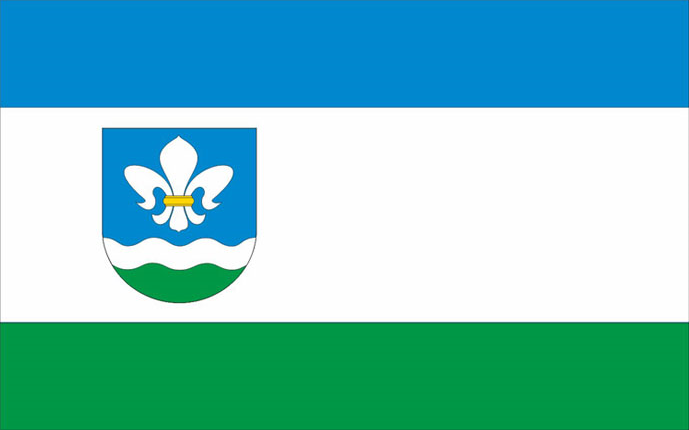
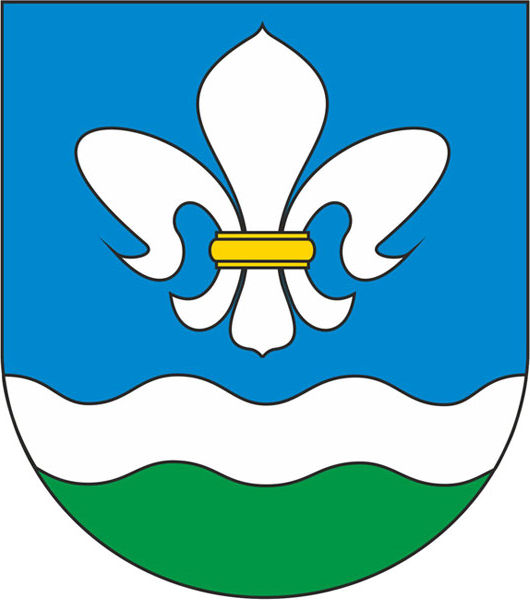
- Flag Coat of arms
- Interactive map of Gmina Lądek
- Coordinates (Lądek): 52°13′N 17°56′E
- Country: Poland
- Voivodeship: Greater Poland
- County: Słupca
- Seat: Lądek

Area
  - Total: 98.32 km^{2} (37.96 sq mi)

Population (2006)
  - Total: 5,660
  - Density: 57.6/km^{2} (149/sq mi)
- Website: http://www.gmina-ladek.pl/

Gmina Lądek is a rural gmina (administrative district) in Słupca County, Greater Poland Voivodeship, in west-central Poland. Its seat is the village of Lądek, which lies approximately 11 kilometres (7 mi) south-east of Słupca and 73 km (45 mi) east of the regional capital Poznań.

The gmina covers an area of 98.32 square kilometres (38.0 sq mi), and as of 2006 its total population is 5,660.

The gmina contains part of the protected area called Warta Landscape Park.

== Villages ==
Gmina Lądek contains the villages and settlements of Ciążeń, Ciążeń-Holendry, Dąbrowa, Dolany, Dziedzice, Jaroszyn, Jaroszyn-Kolonia, Ląd, Ląd-Kolonia, Lądek, Nakielec, Piotrowo, Policko, Ratyń, Samarzewo, Sługocin, Sługocin-Kolonia, Wacławów and Wola Koszucka.

== Neighbouring gminas ==
Gmina Lądek is bordered by the town of Słupca and by the gminas of Golina, Kołaczkowo, Pyzdry, Rzgów, Słupca and Zagórów.
