= Koszuty-Parcele =

- Village
- Location within Poland
- Coordinates: 52°17′51″N 17°55′31″E
- Country: Poland
- Voivodeship: Greater Poland
- County: Słupca
- Gmina: Słupca

Koszuty-Parcele [kɔˈʂutɨ parˈt͡sɛlɛ] is a village in the administrative district of Gmina Słupca, within Słupca County, Greater Poland Voivodeship, in west-central Poland.
