= Aptiv =

Automotive parts company

Aptiv PLC
- Formerly: Delphi Automotive plc (2011–2017)
- Type: Public
- Traded as: NYSE: APTV; S&P 500 component
- ISIN: JE00B783TY65
- Industry: Automotive industry
- Founded: 1994; 32 years ago
- Headquarters: Schaffhausen, Switzerland
- Key people: Kevin P. Clark (chairman and CEO)
- Products: Vehicle electronics, systems, modules, and components
- Revenue: ▲US$20.398 billion (2025)
- Operating income: ▼US$1.184 billion (2025)
- Net income: ▼US$165 million (2025)
- Total assets: ▼US$23.413 billion (2025)
- Total equity: ▲US$9.207 billion (2025)
- Number of employees: 140,000 (2025)
- Website: aptiv.com

Aptiv PLC is a supplier of automotive technology and components. It is organized in Jersey and is a resident of Schaffhausen, Switzerland, for tax purposes. The company operates 139 major manufacturing facilities and 11 major technical centers and has a presence in 50 countries.

In 2025, its products were used in 18 of the 20 top-selling vehicle models in the United States. In 2025, 36% of the company's revenues were derived in the United States, 32% were derived in Europe, the Middle East and Africa, and 29% were derived in Asia-Pacific.

The company traces its roots to Delphi Automotive, which was a subsidiary of General Motors until May 1999.

== History ==
The company was established as the Automotive Components Group of General Motors (GM) in 1994. It changed its name to Delphi Automotive Systems in 1995. GM also renamed the various divisions within the newly created Delphi unit. Packard Electric became Delphi Packard Electric Systems; Delco Chassis became Delphi Chassis Systems; Inland Fisher-Guide became Delphi Interior and Lighting Systems; Saginaw became Delphi Saginaw Steering Systems; Harrison Radiator became Delphi Harrison Thermal Systems, and AC Delco became Delphi Energy and Engine Management Systems. In May 1999, GM completed the corporate spin-off of the company.

In 2003, after years of shifting factory work from the United States to lower-cost countries, Delphi began also shifting white-collar work such as engineering and bookkeeping to lower-cost countries.

In March 2005, Delphi disclosed irregular accounting practices dating back to 1999. Executives allegedly used side transactions and manipulated reserves to make financial results appear stronger than they were. Many executives, including CFO Alan Dawes and Chairman J.T. Battenberg were fired or resigned. In October 2006, the executives and the company settled charges by the United States Securities and Exchange Commission. Delphi reported losses of $4.8 billion in 2004 and $2.4 billion in 2005. In October 2005, Delphi filed for bankruptcy protection due to unsustainable legacy labor costs, massive pension obligations, and the loss of contracts from GM.

In February 2007, the company closed its plants in Puerto Real, Cádiz, Spain, with a loss of 1,600 direct jobs, and more than 2,500 indirect jobs. The closure came despite agreements by the company to continue its manufacturing operations until 2010 in exchange for more than €25 million from the government. The Regional Government of Andalusia sued the company for breach of local labor laws. In July 2007, Delphi agreed to pay €500 million in costs, including €120 million to workers, for permission to close the plants. Workers received 45 days of severance pay for every year they worked at the company.

In August 2007, a group of investors led by hedge fund Appaloosa Management agreed to lend Delphi $2.55 billion to rescue the company from bankruptcy. In April 2008, the investors pulled the plan, claiming that Delphi did not live up to the terms of the agreement. In May 2008, Delphi sued the investors. In October 2009, the lawsuit was settled. EnerDel started as a joint venture of Ener1 and Delphi. In August 2008, Ener1 bought exclusive ownership of EnerDel. In April 2009, CoolIT Systems acquired the assets of Delphi Thermal Liquid Cooling, including intellectual property, machinery, and equipment. Delphi exited bankruptcy protection in October 2009. As part of the reorganization, Delphi Holdings LLP was acquired by senior creditors Elliott Investment Management and Silver Point Capital. Some of its non-core steering operations were sold to General Motors Company, the successor to the bankrupt Motors Liquidation Company that was formerly General Motors Corporation. As a result of the bankruptcy reorganization, Delphi surrendered its pension obligations to the Pension Benefit Guaranty Corporation. A group of about 20,000 salaried employees, principally in Ohio, Michigan, New York and Indiana, sued to restore their full pension rights. The new Delphi was incorporated in the United Kingdom for tax purposes.

In November 2011, the company once again became a public company via an initial public offering, selling 24.1 million shares for $22 each.

In 2013, Delphi became involved in a lawsuit against GM because Delphi manufactured the defective ignition switches used in the Chevrolet Cobalt. In November 2014, Delphi reached a deal to turn over evidence in exchange for being dropped as a defendant in the case. Delphi sold its Thermal Business unit to Mahle-Behr GmbH in July 2015 for $727 million. In July 2015, Delphi bought HellermannTyton for $1.7 billion. Delphi entered into a partnership agreement with Carbon in June 2016 to allow the use of Carbon's Continuous Liquid Interface Production technology and printers. Delphi acquired NuTonomy for $450 million in October 2017. In December 2017, the company completed the corporate spin-off of Delphi Technologies, its powertrain and aftermarket related businesses and the company was renamed Aptiv plc.

In May 2018, the company relocated its headquarters from the United Kingdom to Ireland, citing Ireland's favorable regulatory environment, technology hub, access to top universities, and public infrastructure.

In August 2019, Aptiv and Hyundai Motor Group announced plans to establish a $4 billion autonomous driving joint venture in which the firms would each have a 50% stake. The joint venture deal was completed in March 2020 and was named Motional in August 2020.

In January 2021, Aptiv revealed a new self-driving car platform that can be applied on various vehicles and that carmakers can upgrade wirelessly.

Aptiv acquired Wind River Systems, a developer of cloud-native, intelligent edge software, from TPG Inc. in January 2022 and then acquired an 18% stake in Maxieye Automotive Technology, a Chinese provider of products for self-driving cars, in October 2024. In January 2025, the company relocated its headquarters to Switzerland for tax purposes.

In April 2026, the company completed the corporate spin-off of Versigent.
