= Lądek, Słupca County =

Village in Słupca County

Lądek
- Village
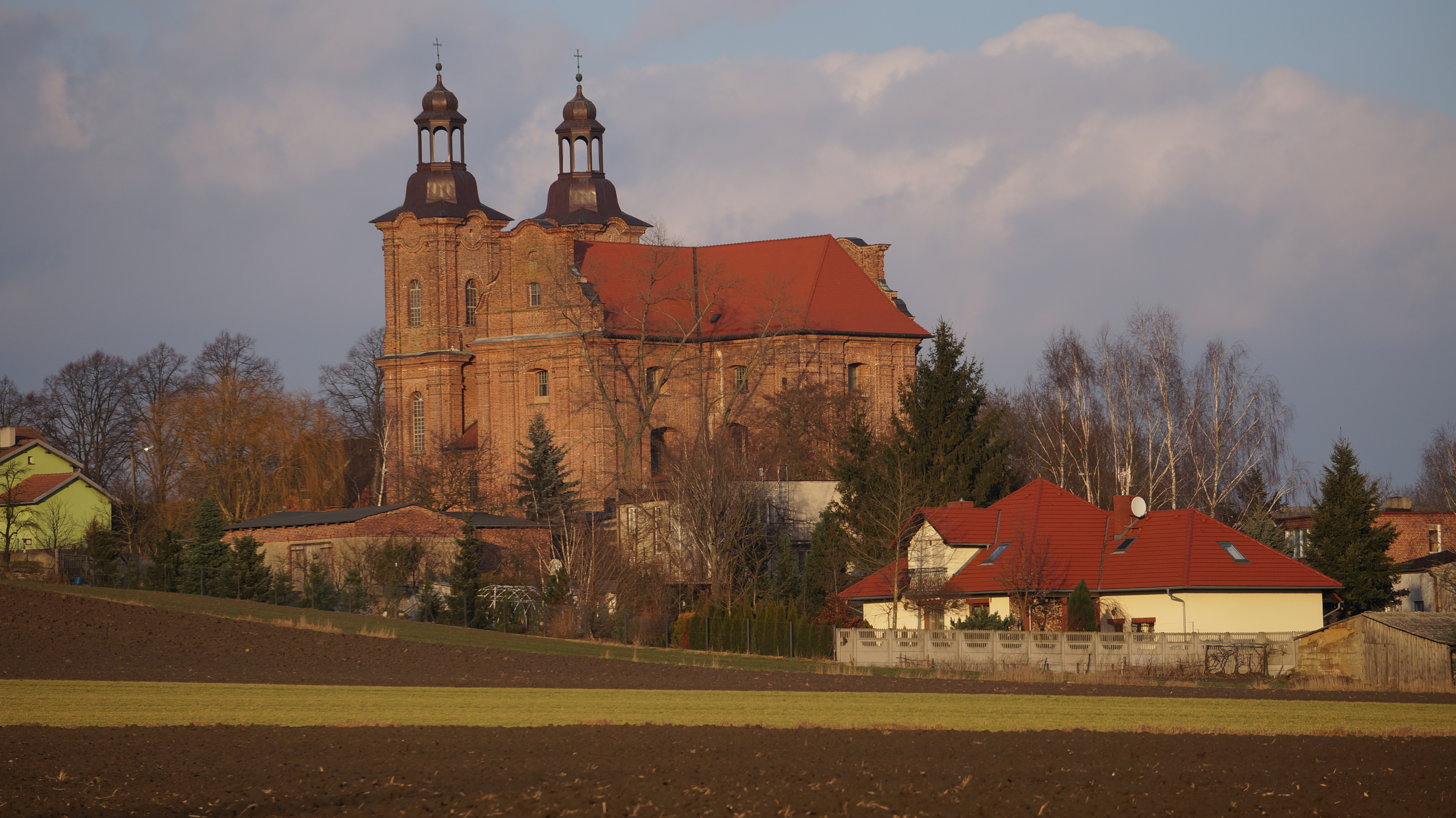
- Saint Nicholas Church

- Location within Poland
- Coordinates: 52°13′N 17°56′E
- Country: Poland
- Voivodeship: Greater Poland
- County: Słupca
- Gmina: Lądek
- Population: 790

Lądek [ˈlɔndɛk] is a village in Słupca County, Greater Poland Voivodeship, in west-central Poland. It is the seat of the gmina (administrative district) called Gmina Lądek.
