= Kosakowo, Greater Poland Voivodeship =

Kosakowo
- Settlement
- Location within Poland
- Coordinates: 52°30′39″N 18°07′06″E
- Country: Poland
- Voivodeship: Greater Poland
- County: Słupca
- Gmina: Orchowo

Kosakowo [kɔsaˈkɔvɔ] is a settlement in the administrative district of Gmina Orchowo, within Słupca County, Greater Poland Voivodeship, in west-central Poland.
