= Gmina Ostrowite =

Gmina Ostrowite Ostrowite Commune
- Gmina
- Coat of arms
- Interactive map of Gmina Ostrowite
- Coordinates (Ostrowite): 52°23′N 18°3′E
- Country: Poland
- Voivodeship: Greater Poland
- County: Słupca
- Seat: Ostrowite

Area
  - Total: 104.1 km^{2} (40.2 sq mi)

Population (2006)
  - Total: 5,069
  - Density: 48.69/km^{2} (126.1/sq mi)
- Website: http://www.ostrowite.pl

Gmina Ostrowite is a rural gmina (administrative district) in Słupca County, Greater Poland Voivodeship, in west-central Poland. Its seat is the village of Ostrowite, which lies approximately 16 kilometres (10 mi) north-east of Słupca and 78 km (48 mi) east of the regional capital Poznań.

The gmina covers an area of 104.1 square kilometres (40.2 sq mi), and as of 2006 its total population is 5,069.

== Villages ==
Gmina Ostrowite contains the villages and settlements of Doły, Giewartów, Giewartów-Holendry, Gostuń, Grabina, Izdebno, Jarotki, Kania, Kąpiel, Kosewo, Lipnica, Mieczownica, Naprusewo, Ostrowite, Przecław, Sienno, Siernicze Małe, Siernicze Wielkie, Skrzynka Mała, Stara Olszyna, Świnna, Szyszłowo, Tomaszewo and Tomiszewo.

== Neighbouring gminas ==
Gmina Ostrowite is bordered by the gminas of Kazimierz Biskupi, Kleczew, Powidz and Słupca.
