= Orchowo =

- Village
- Location within Poland
- Coordinates: 52°31′N 18°1′E
- Country: Poland
- Voivodeship: Greater Poland
- County: Słupca
- Gmina: Orchowo

Orchowo [ɔrˈxɔvɔ] is a village in Słupca County, Greater Poland Voivodeship, in west-central Poland. It is the seat of the gmina (administrative district) called Gmina Orchowo.
