= Koszuty, Słupca County =

Koszuty
- Village
- Location within Poland
- Coordinates: 52°17′19″N 17°55′1″E
- Country: Poland
- Voivodeship: Greater Poland
- County: Słupca
- Gmina: Słupca
- Population: 240
- Time zone: UTC+1 (CET)
  - Summer (DST): UTC+2 (CEST)
- Vehicle registration: PSL

Koszuty [kɔˈʂutɨ] is a village in the administrative district of Gmina Słupca, within Słupca County, Greater Poland Voivodeship, in west-central Poland.

== History ==
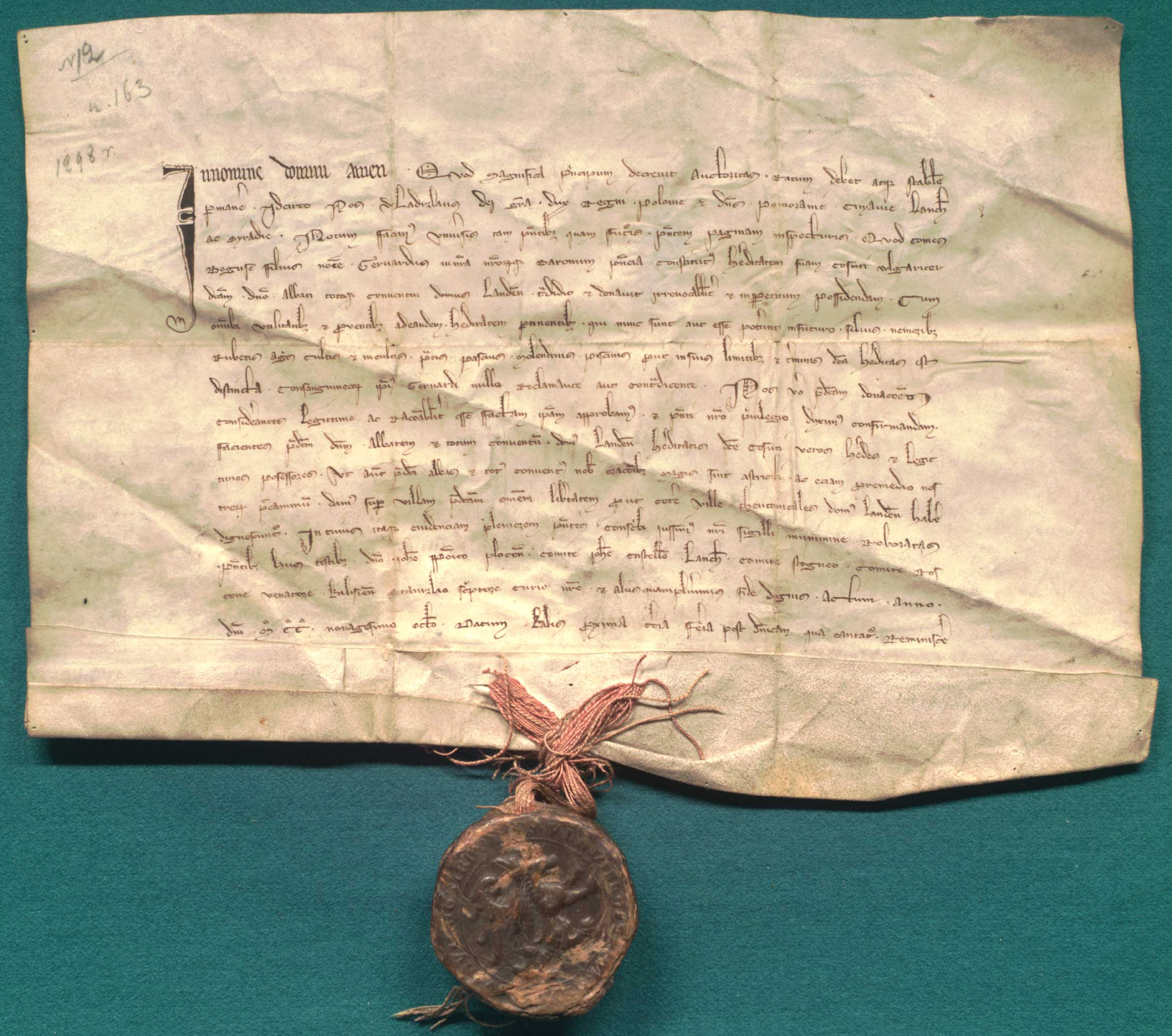
Polish ruler Władysław I Łokietek confirms the donation of Koszuty to the Cistercian Abbey in Ląd

As part of the region of Greater Poland, i.e. the cradle of the Polish state, the area formed part of Poland since its establishment in the 10th century. Koszuty was a private church village of the monastery in Ląd, administratively located in the Konin County in the Kalisz Voivodeship in the Greater Poland Province of the Kingdom of Poland.

During the German occupation of Poland (World War II), in 1940, the German gendarmerie carried out expulsions of Poles, who were then placed in a transit camp in Łódź, and afterwards deported to the General Government in the more eastern part of German-occupied Poland, while their houses and farms were handed over to German colonists as part of the Lebensraum policy.
