= Wacławów, Greater Poland Voivodeship =

Wacławów
- Village
- Location within Poland
- Coordinates: 52°14′N 18°0′E
- Country: Poland
- Voivodeship: Greater Poland
- County: Słupca
- Gmina: Lądek

Wacławów [vat͡sˈwavuf] is a village in the administrative district of Gmina Lądek, within Słupca County, Greater Poland Voivodeship, in west-central Poland.
