= Gmina Powidz =

Gmina Powidz Powidz Commune
- Gmina
- Interactive map of Gmina Powidz
- Coordinates (Powidz): 52°25′49″N 17°55′6″E
- Country: Poland
- Voivodeship: Greater Poland
- County: Słupca
- Seat: Powidz

Area
  - Total: 80.15 km^{2} (30.95 sq mi)

Population (2006)
  - Total: 2,077
  - Density: 25.91/km^{2} (67.12/sq mi)

Gmina Powidz is a rural gmina (administrative district) in Słupca County, Greater Poland Voivodeship, in west-central Poland. Its seat is the village of Powidz, which lies approximately 15 kilometres (9 mi) north of Słupca and 69 km (43 mi) east of the regional capital Poznań.

The gmina covers an area of 80.15 square kilometres (30.9 sq mi), and as of 2006 its total population is 2,077.

== Villages ==
Gmina Powidz contains the villages and settlements of Anastazewo, Charbin, Ługi, Ostrowo, Polanowo, Powidz, Powidz-Osiedle, Przybrodzin, Smolniki Powidzkie and Wylatkowo.

== Neighbouring gminas ==
Gmina Powidz is bordered by the gminas of Kleczew, Orchowo, Ostrowite, Słupca, Strzałkowo and Witkowo.
