= J. T. Battenberg III =

American businessman

J. T. Battenberg III (born 1944) was the chairman, CEO, and president of Delphi Corporation from 1998 to 2005.

== Early life and career ==
Battenberg obtained a Bachelor of Science from Kettering University in 1966 and a Master of Business Administration from Columbia Business School in 1969. He joined General Motors in 1961 and later took over management of Delphi, a GM spinoff.
