= Rękawczyn, Greater Poland Voivodeship =

Rękawczyn
- Village
- Location within Poland
- Coordinates: 52°31′N 17°56′E
- Country: Poland
- Voivodeship: Greater Poland
- County: Słupca
- Gmina: Orchowo

Rękawczyn [rɛnˈkaft͡ʂɨn] is a village in the administrative district of Gmina Orchowo, within Słupca County, Greater Poland Voivodeship, in west-central Poland.
