= Niezgoda, Greater Poland Voivodeship =

Niezgoda
- Village
- Location within Poland
- Coordinates: 52°22′N 17°55′E
- Country: Poland
- Voivodeship: Greater Poland
- County: Słupca
- Gmina: Słupca

Niezgoda [ɲɛzˈɡɔda] is a village in the administrative district of Gmina Słupca, within Słupca County, Greater Poland Voivodeship, in west-central Poland.
