= Ostrowite, Słupca County =

Ostrowite
- Village
- Location within Poland
- Coordinates: 52°23′N 18°3′E
- Country: Poland
- Voivodeship: Greater Poland
- County: Słupca
- Gmina: Ostrowite

Ostrowite [ɔstrɔˈvitɛ] is a village in Słupca County, Greater Poland Voivodeship, in west-central Poland. It is the seat of the gmina (administrative district) called Gmina Ostrowite.
