= Szydłowiec, Greater Poland Voivodeship =

Szydłowiec
- Village
- Location within Poland
- Coordinates: 52°29′N 18°3′E
- Country: Poland
- Voivodeship: Greater Poland
- County: Słupca
- Gmina: Orchowo

Szydłowiec [ʂɨˈdwɔvjɛt͡s] is a village in the administrative district of Gmina Orchowo, within Słupca County, Greater Poland Voivodeship, in west-central Poland.
