= Koszuty Małe =

- Village
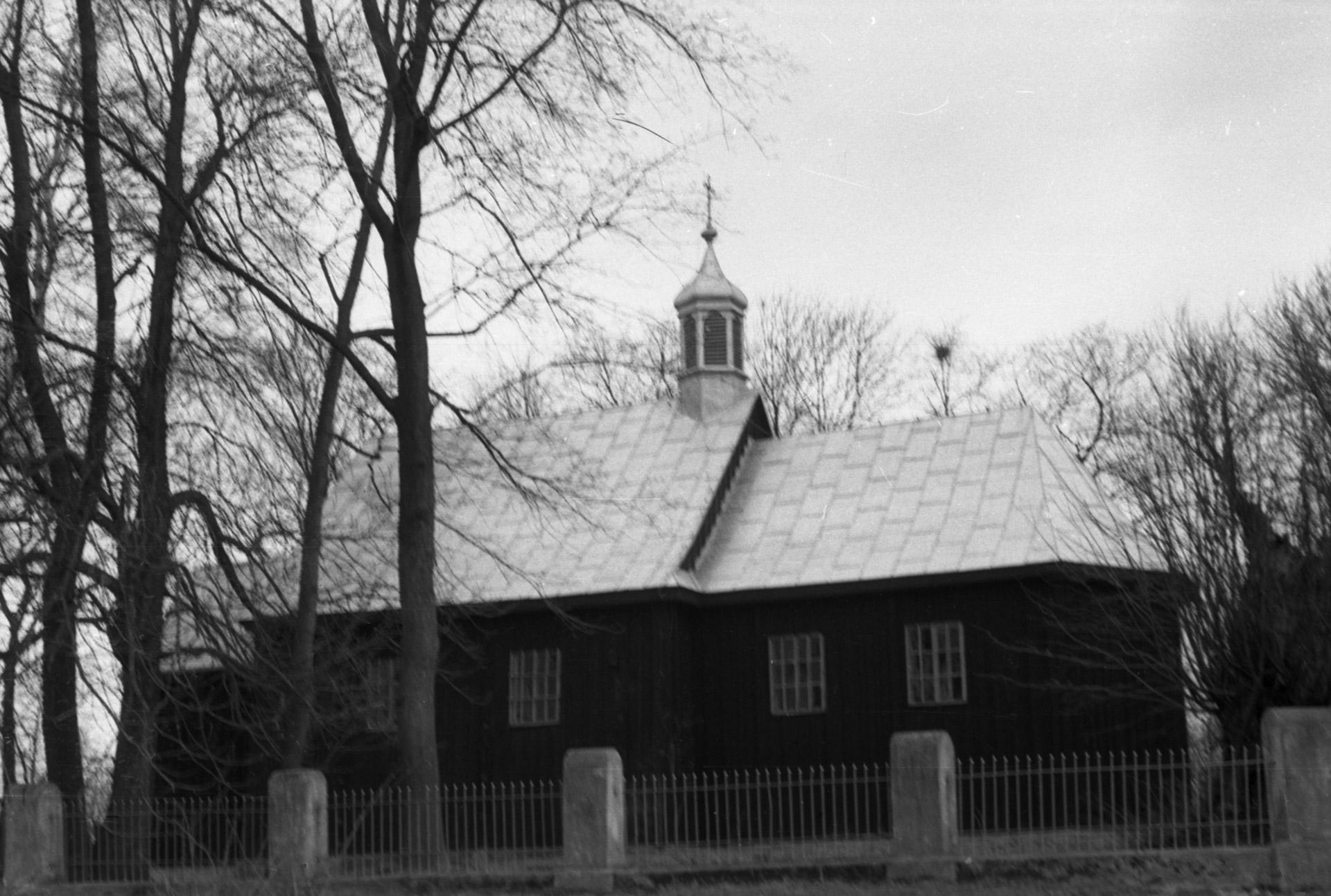
- Wooden church

- Location within Poland
- Coordinates: 52°17′32″N 17°54′36″E
- Country: Poland
- Voivodeship: Greater Poland
- County: Słupca
- Gmina: Słupca

Koszuty Małe [kɔˈʂutɨ ˈmawɛ] is a village in the administrative district of Gmina Słupca, within Słupca County, Greater Poland Voivodeship, in west-central Poland.
