= Gmina Słupca =

Gmina Słupca Słupca Commune
- Gmina
- Coat of arms
- Interactive map of Gmina Słupca
- Coordinates (Słupca): 52°18′N 17°52′E
- Country: Poland
- Voivodeship: Greater Poland
- County: Słupca
- Seat: Słupca

Area
  - Total: 144.93 km^{2} (55.96 sq mi)

Population (2006)
  - Total: 8,974
  - Density: 61.92/km^{2} (160.4/sq mi)
- Website: http://www.gmina.slupca.pl/

Gmina Słupca is a rural gmina (administrative district) in Słupca County, Greater Poland Voivodeship, in west-central Poland. Its seat is the town of Słupca, although the town is not part of the territory of the gmina.

The gmina covers an area of 144.93 square kilometres (56.0 sq mi), and as of 2006 its total population is 8,974.

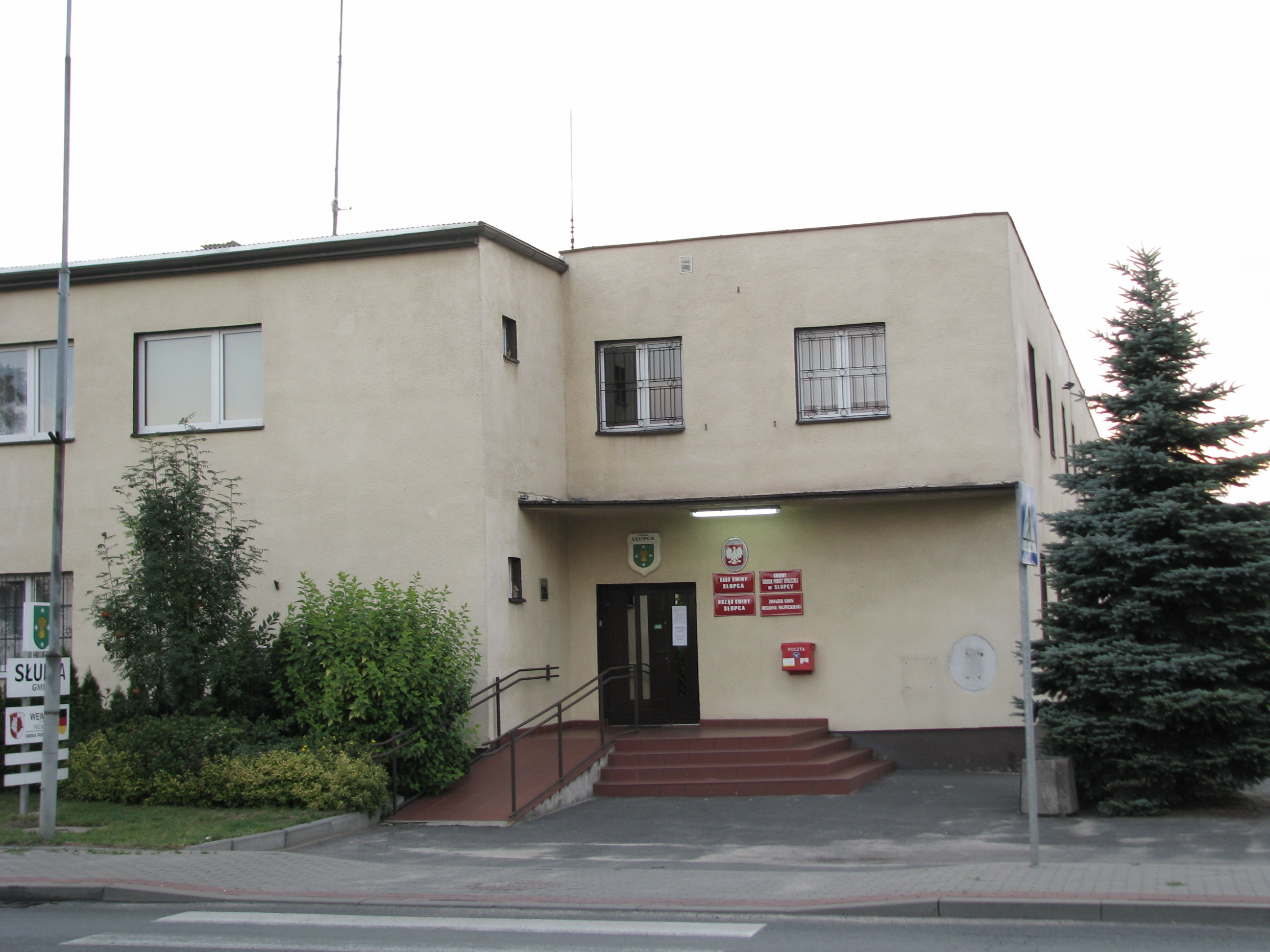

The gmina contains part of the protected area called Powidz Landscape Park.

== Villages ==
Gmina Słupca contains the villages and settlements of Benignowo, Bielawy, Borki, Cienin Kościelny, Cienin Zaborny, Cienin Zaborny-Parcele, Cienin-Kolonia, Cienin-Perze, Czerwonka, Czesławowo, Drążna, Gółkowo, Grobla, Grzybków, Jaworowo, Józefowo, Kamień, Kąty, Kluczewnica, Kochowo, Korwin, Koszuty, Koszuty Małe, Koszuty-Parcele, Kotunia, Kowalewo Opactwo-Parcele, Kowalewo Opactwo-Wieś, Kowalewo-Góry, Kowalewo-Opactwo, Kowalewo-Sołectwo, Kunowo, Marcewek, Marcewo, Meszna, Michałowo, Młodojewo, Młodojewo-Parcele, Niezgoda, Nowa Wieś, Pępocin, Piotrowice, Piotrowice-Parcele, Pokoje, Poniatówek, Posada, Rokosz, Róża, Rozalin, Sergiejewo, Szkudłówka, Wierzbno, Wierzbocice, Wilczna, Wola Koszucka-Parcele, Zaborze, Zacisze, Zastawie and Żelazków.

== Neighbouring gminas ==
Gmina Słupca is bordered by the town of Słupca and by the gminas of Golina, Kazimierz Biskupi, Lądek, Ostrowite, Powidz and Strzałkowo.
