= Nabram coat of arms =

Polish coat of arms

Nabram
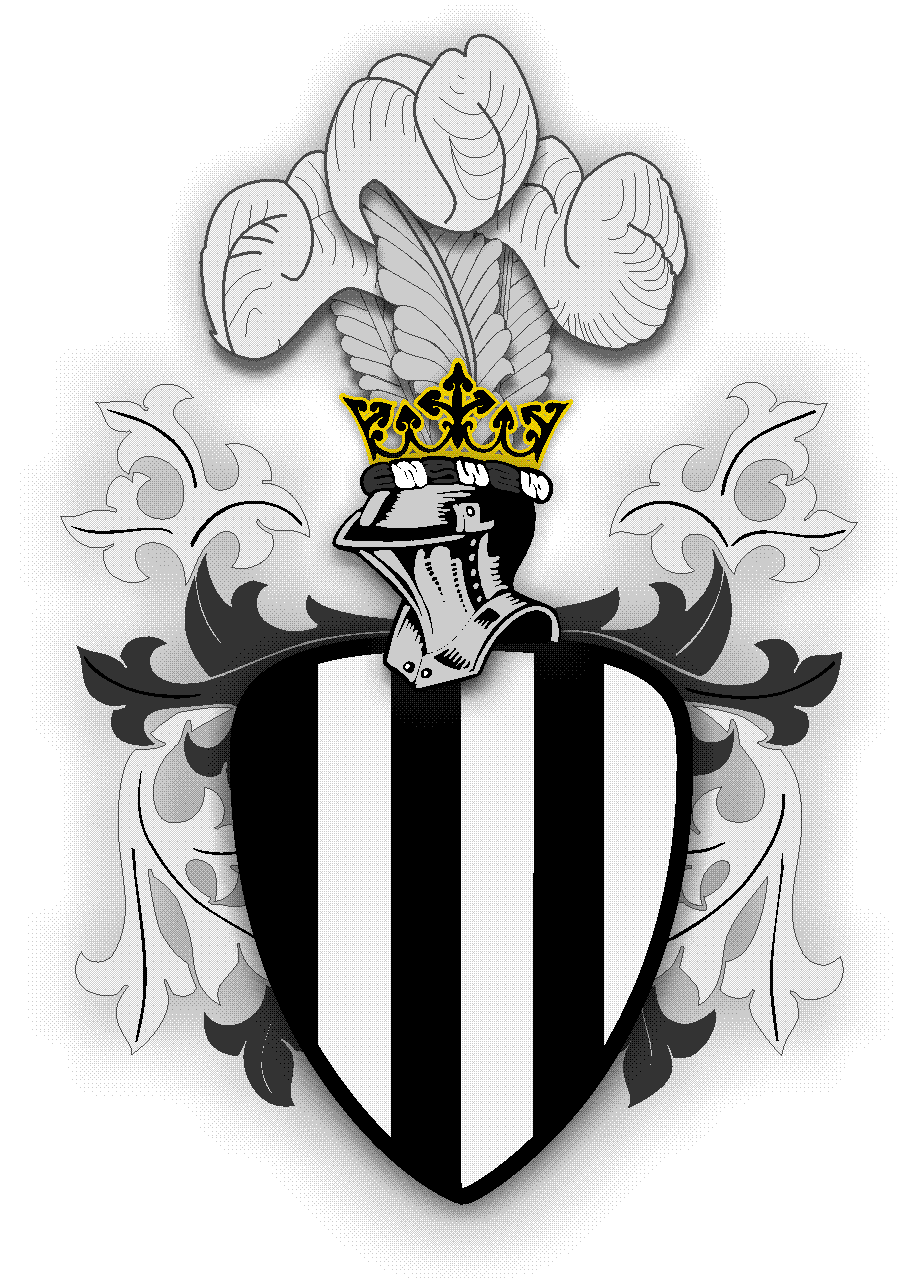
- Battle cry: Nabram!
- Alternative names: Nabra, Kłobuk, Stańcowie, Waldorff, Wendorf
- Earliest mention: 1292 - 1386
- Towns: Jedlinsk, Jedlnia Koscielna, Sieroszewice, Tluczan, Kossowa
- Families: Bor, Boremski, Brodelski, Borodelski, Chotecki, Czasławski, Honckiewicz, Hondorf, Huppe, Jasniewicz, Jedleński, Jedliński, Kałczyński, Kazimirski, Kubiczek, Kubiczek de Waldorf, Mietrowski, Nadratowski, Nadrodorf, Nadrowski, Nagórka, Pejszowski, Pielgrzym, Piels, Pielstowski, Porębski, Preiss (Prajs), Prejszkowski, Rogalowski, Rogowski, Rosperski, Rospierski, Sieroszewski, Sosnowski, Ufnarowski, Underowicz, Undorf, Waldorf, Wendorf, Wolwanowski, Wolicki, Wulwanowski, Żołecki.

Nabram is a Polish coat of arms. It was used by a number of szlachta (noble) families in 1292–1386 under Poland's Piast dynasty. The Nabram coat of arms is also known as Nabra, Kłobuk, Stańcowie, Waldorff, and Wendorf.

== Blazon ==
The official heraldic description of the Nabram coat of arms is, "Nabram vel Waldorff, cuius insignia in campo albo tres barre nigre, a capite clipei in longum producte." (Translation: Nabram or Waldorff, which character in white area are three black beams, from the head of shield direct on length.)

The Nabram coat of arms has three vertical black stripes and three vertical white stripes, starting with white on the left side and alternating across. Three ostrich quills extend from the crowned helmet.
