= Eugeniusz Grzeszczak =

Polish politician (born 1954)

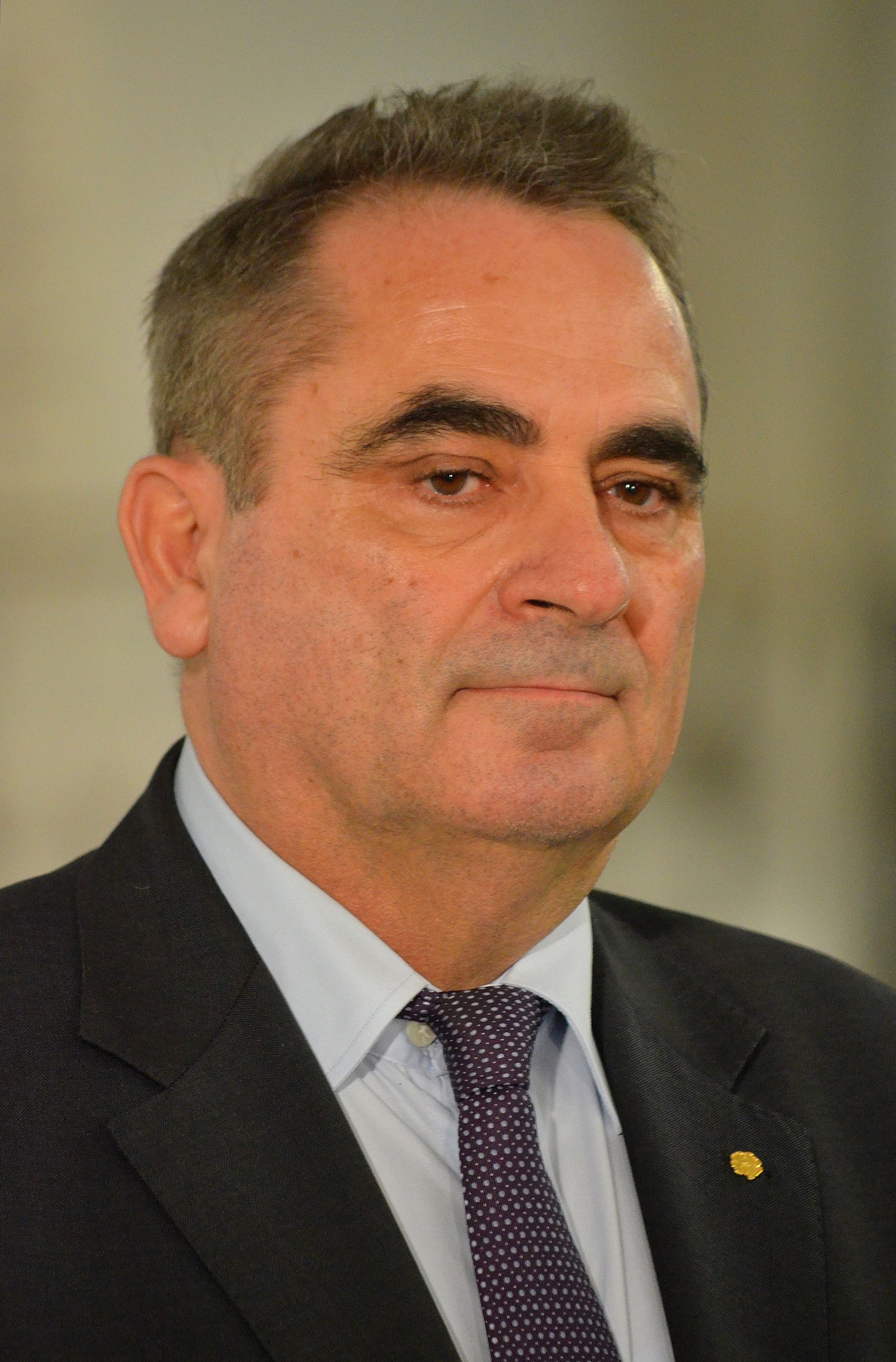

Deputy Marshal of Sejm
- In office 8 November 2011 – 11 November 2015

Personal details
- Born: 1954 (age 71–72)
- Party: Polish People's Party

Eugeniusz Tomasz Grzeszczak (born 29 December 1954 in Kowalewo-Opactwo) is a Polish politician. He was elected to the Sejm on 25 September 2005, getting 5,181 votes in 37 Konin district as a candidate from the Polish People's Party list.

He was also a member of Senate 1991-1993 and Senate 1993-1997.

== See also ==
- Members of Polish Sejm 2005-2007
