= Gmina Orchowo =

Gmina Orchowo Orchowo Commune
- Gmina
- Coat of arms
- Interactive map of Gmina Orchowo
- Coordinates (Orchowo): 52°31′N 18°1′E
- Country: Poland
- Voivodeship: Greater Poland
- County: Słupca
- Seat: Orchowo

Area
  - Total: 98.12 km^{2} (37.88 sq mi)

Population (2006)
  - Total: 3,892
  - Density: 39.67/km^{2} (102.7/sq mi)
- Website: http://www.orchowo.pl

Gmina Orchowo is a rural gmina (administrative district) in Słupca County, Greater Poland Voivodeship, in west-central Poland. Its seat is the village of Orchowo, which lies approximately 27 kilometres (17 mi) north-east of Słupca and 76 km (47 mi) east of the regional capital Poznań.

The gmina covers an area of 98.12 square kilometres (37.9 sq mi), and as of 2006 its total population is 3,892.

== Villages ==
Gmina Orchowo contains the villages and settlements of Bielsko, Gałczynek, Głucha Puszcza, Kinno, Kosakowo, Linowiec, Mlecze, Myślątkowo, Orchówek, Orchowo, Osowiec, Ostrówek, Podbielsko, Podlesie, Rękawczyn, Rękawczynek, Różanna, Siedluchno, Skubarczewo, Słowikowo, Suszewo, Szydłowiec and Wólka Orchowska.

== Neighbouring gminas ==
Gmina Orchowo is bordered by the gminas of Jeziora Wielkie, Kleczew, Mogilno, Powidz, Strzelno, Trzemeszno, Wilczyn and Witkowo.
