= Słupca County =

County in Poland

Słupca County Powiat słupecki
- County
- Flag Coat of arms

- Location within the voivodeship

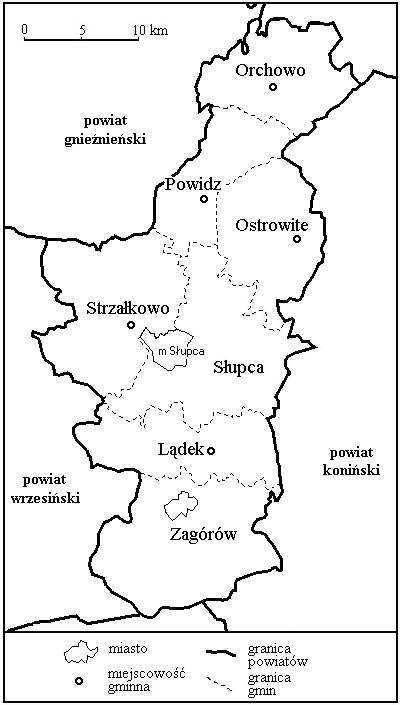
- Division into gminas
- Coordinates (Słupca): 52°18′N 17°52′E
- Country: Poland
- Voivodeship: Greater Poland
- Seat: Słupca
- Gminas: Total 8 (incl. 1 urban): Słupca; Gmina Lądek; Gmina Orchowo; Gmina Ostrowite; Gmina Powidz; Gmina Słupca; Gmina Strzałkowo; Gmina Zagórów

Area
  - Total: 837.91 km^{2} (323.52 sq mi)

Population (2006)
  - Total: 58,725
  - Density: 70.085/km^{2} (181.52/sq mi)
  - Urban: 17,295
  - Rural: 41,430
- Car plates: PSL
- Website: www.powiat-slupca.pl

Słupca County (Polish: powiat słupecki) is a unit of territorial administration and local government (powiat) in Greater Poland Voivodeship, west-central Poland. It came into being on January 1, 1999, as a result of the Polish local government reforms passed in 1998. Its administrative seat and largest town is Słupca, which lies 66 kilometres (41 mi) east of the regional capital Poznań. The only other town in the county is Zagórów, lying 16 km (10 mi) south of Słupca.

The county covers an area of 837.91 square kilometres (323.5 sq mi). As of 2006 its total population is 58,725, out of which the population of Słupca is 14,363, that of Zagórów is 2,932, and the rural population is 41,430.

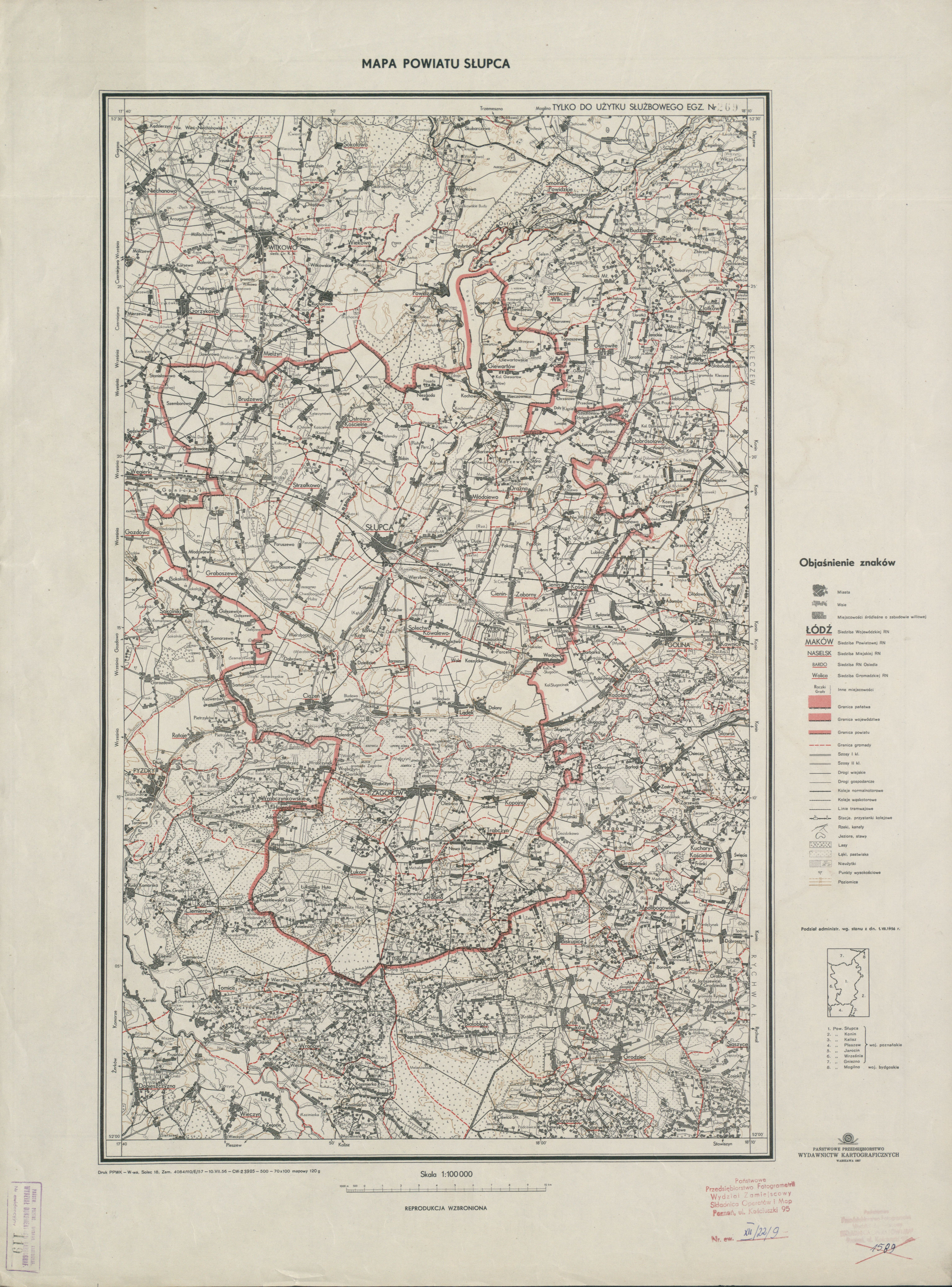
Map of the county 1957 from the State Archive in Poznań

== Neighbouring counties ==
Słupca County is bordered by Mogilno County to the north, Konin County to the east, Pleszew County to the south, Września County to the west and Gniezno County to the north-west.

== Administrative divisions ==
The county is subdivided into eight gminas (one urban, one urban-rural and six rural). These are listed in the following table, in descending order of population.

Gmina	Type	Area (km^{2})	Population (2006)	Seat
Słupca	urban	10.3	14,363	
Gmina Strzałkowo	rural	142.4	9,617	Strzałkowo
Gmina Zagórów	urban-rural	159.6	9,073	Zagórów
Gmina Słupca	rural	144.9	8,974	Słupca *
Gmina Lądek	rural	98.3	5,660	Lądek
Gmina Ostrowite	rural	104.1	5,069	Ostrowite
Gmina Orchowo	rural	98.1	3,892	Orchowo
Gmina Powidz	rural	80.2	2,077	Powidz
* seat not part of the gmina
