= Anna Iwaszkiewicz =

Polish writer and translator (1897–1979)

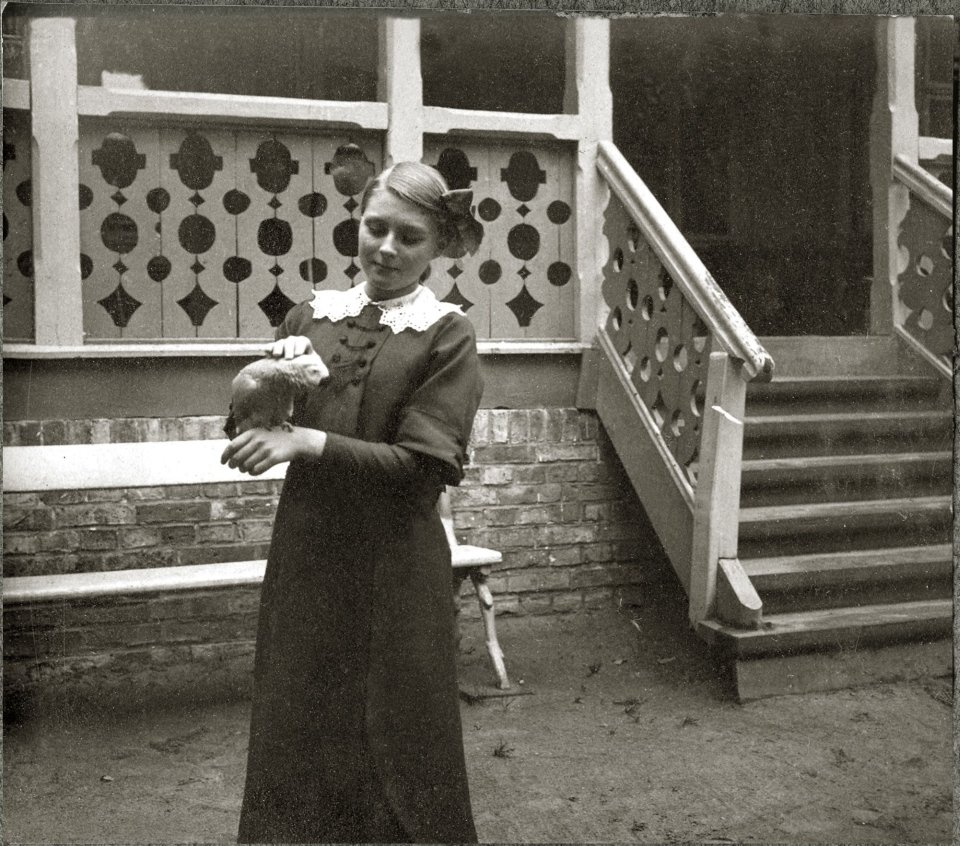
- Iwaszkiewicz in 1914
- Born: Anna Lilpop; 17 December 1897; Brwinów, Poland
- Died: 23 December 1979 (aged 82); Stawisko, Poland
- Resting place: Roman-Catholic Cemetery in Brwinów
- Occupations: Writer and translator
- Spouse: Jarosław Iwaszkiewicz
- Children: Maria and Teresa
- Parent(s): Stanisław Wilhelm Lilpop and Jadwiga nee Stankiewicz

Anna Iwaszkiewicz, née Lilpop (pen name: Adam Podkowiński, 17 December 1897 – 23 December 1979), was a Polish writer and translator, wife of the writer Jarosław Iwaszkiewicz.

For her role in rescuing Jews during World War II, she and her husband were honored with the award of Righteous Among the Nations.

== Biography ==
=== Early years ===
When Anna was four years old, her mother Jadwiga Stankiewicz left her and her father, wealthy industrialist Stanisław Wilhelm Lilpop, for the pianist Józef Śliwiński. From then on, her father and aunt Aniela Pilawitz brought her up, while her mother was denied any contact with Anna. From 1915 to 1918, she stayed with her father in the Russian Empire, particularly in Moscow and Kyiv. Her time in the Russian Empire contributed to the formation of her literary talent as she studied at the Moscow Polish University, learned foreign languages, and became interested in music and theater. In Russia, she acquired knowledge about the work of Scriabin, who later became her favorite composer and whose music she would promote in Poland by organizing his concerts in Warsaw.

=== Marriage ===
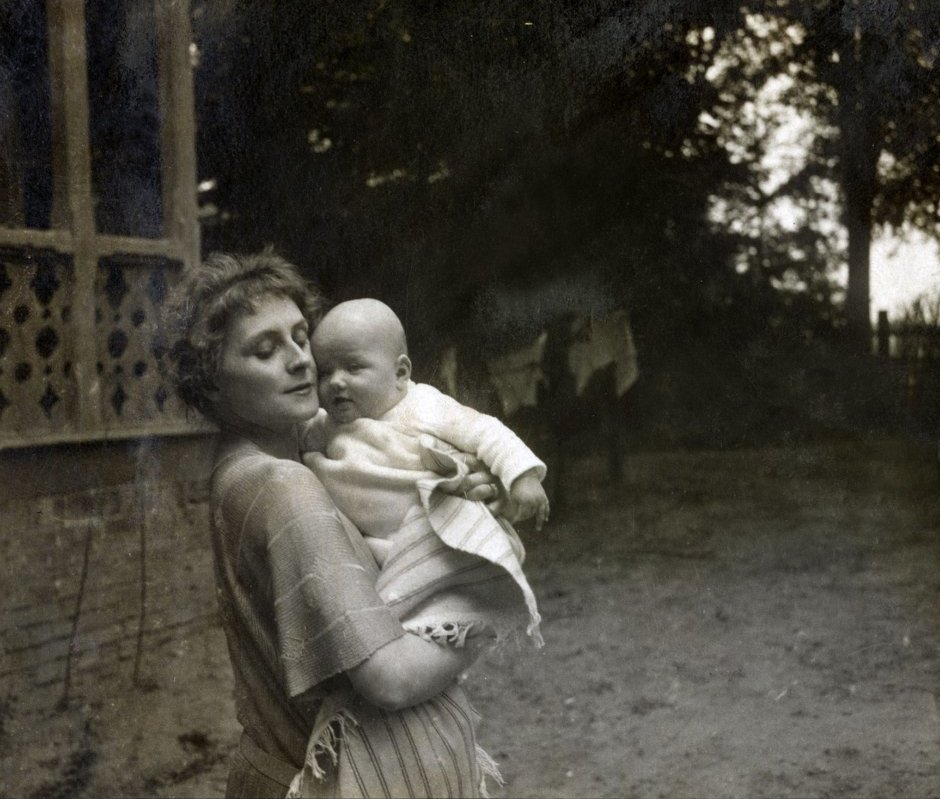
Anna Iwaszkiewicz with a daughter (1924)

On 12 September 1922, after overcoming the initial resistance of her father, she married poet Jarosław Iwaszkiewicz. For this marriage, she broke off an engagement to Prince Krzysztof Radziwiłł, arranged several years earlier. Through her marriage she gained the opportunity to establish contacts with the artistic and literary community.

She gave birth to daughters: Maria and Teresa.

=== Wartime ===
During the German occupation, she helped Polish Jews by organizing their escape from the Ghetto and hiding them in Stawisko. For this activity, on 21 January 1988, she and her husband were honored with the award of Righteous Among the Nations.

== Literary activity ==
Anna wrote for journals for many years, which demonstrate her literary talent and personality. Anna published essays, mainly on the works of Marcel Proust, Joseph Conrad and Thomas Mann (partly under a pseudonym). She translated French literature (Marcel Proust, Michel Butor, Alain-Fournier, Jules Verne) and English-language literature (Thomas Marton and Alfred North Whitehead). At the end of her life, she published the book Nasze zwierzęta (Our Animals) (1978). Her most outstanding work is Dzienniki i wspomnienia (Diaries and Memoirs) (published in 2000), containing valuable descriptions of life in the interwar period and memories of, among others, Karol Szymanowski, a relative of her husband.

== Personality ==
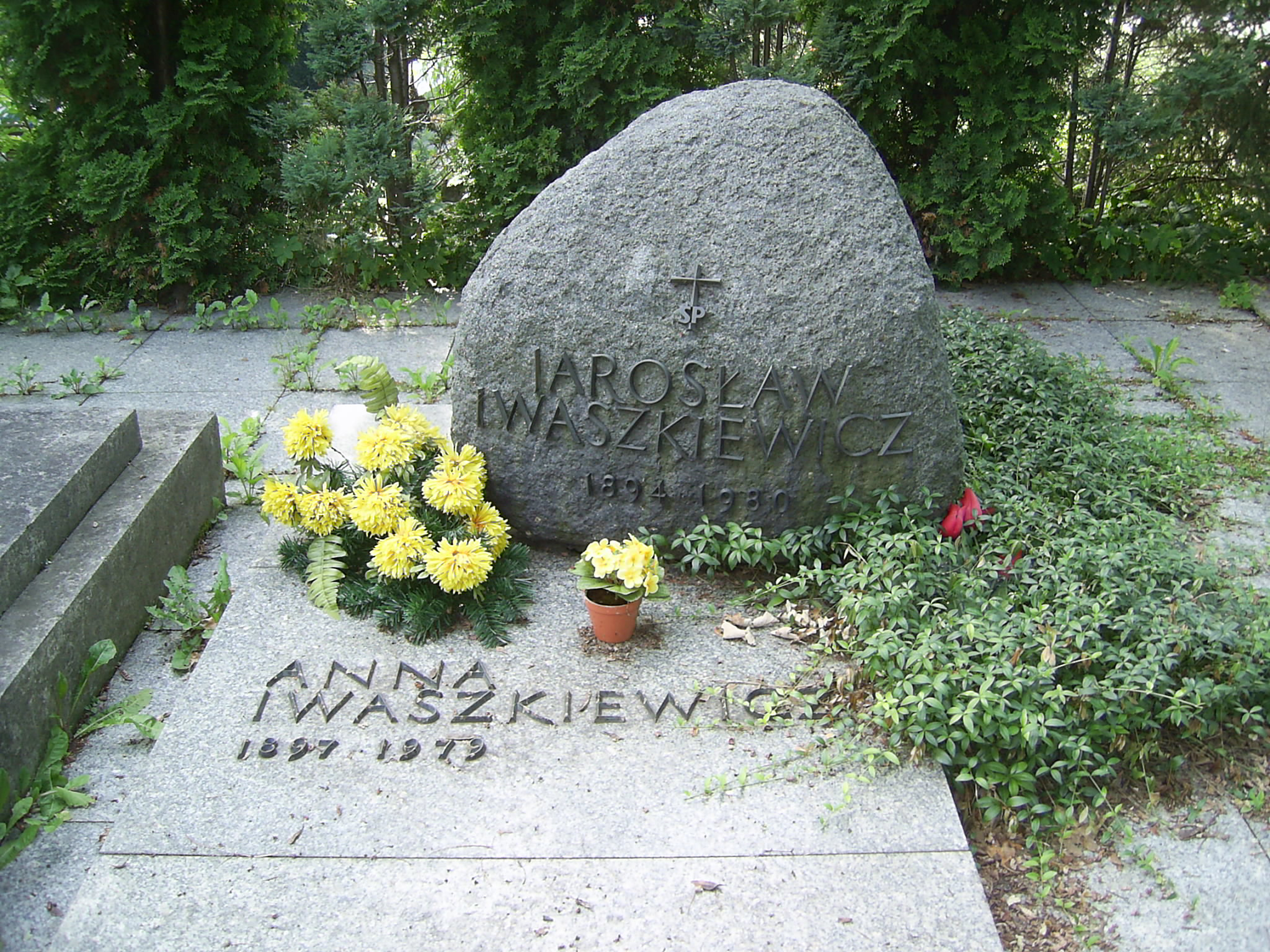
Anna and Jarosław's grave in Brwinów

Anna had mental health issues, including depression. She coped with it by being a devoted Catholic.

Her husband did not hide his sexual orientation or male lovers from her, while Anna herself was bisexual. Nonetheless, the couple considered their marriage happy and successful.
