= Podbiel (disambiguation) =

Podbiel is a village in northern Slovakia.

Podbiel may also refer to:

- Podbiel, Greater Poland Voivodeship (west-central Poland)
- Podbiel, Masovian Voivodeship (east-central Poland)
