= Lukomsky =

Lukomsky or Łukomski (Cyrillic: Лукомский) is a Slavic masculine surname; its feminine counterpart is Lukomska or Lukomskaya. It may refer to the following notable people:

- Alexander Lukomsky (1868–1939), Russian military commander
- Boris Lukomsky (born 1951), Russian fencer
- Halina Łukomska (1929–2016), Polish soprano singer
- Irina Lukomskaya (born 1991), Kazakhstani volleyball player
- Stanislaw Kostka Łukomski (1874–1948), Polish bishop and political activist
- Urszula Łukomska (born 1926), Polish gymnast

== See also ==
- Huta Łukomska, a village in Poland
