= Zagórów =

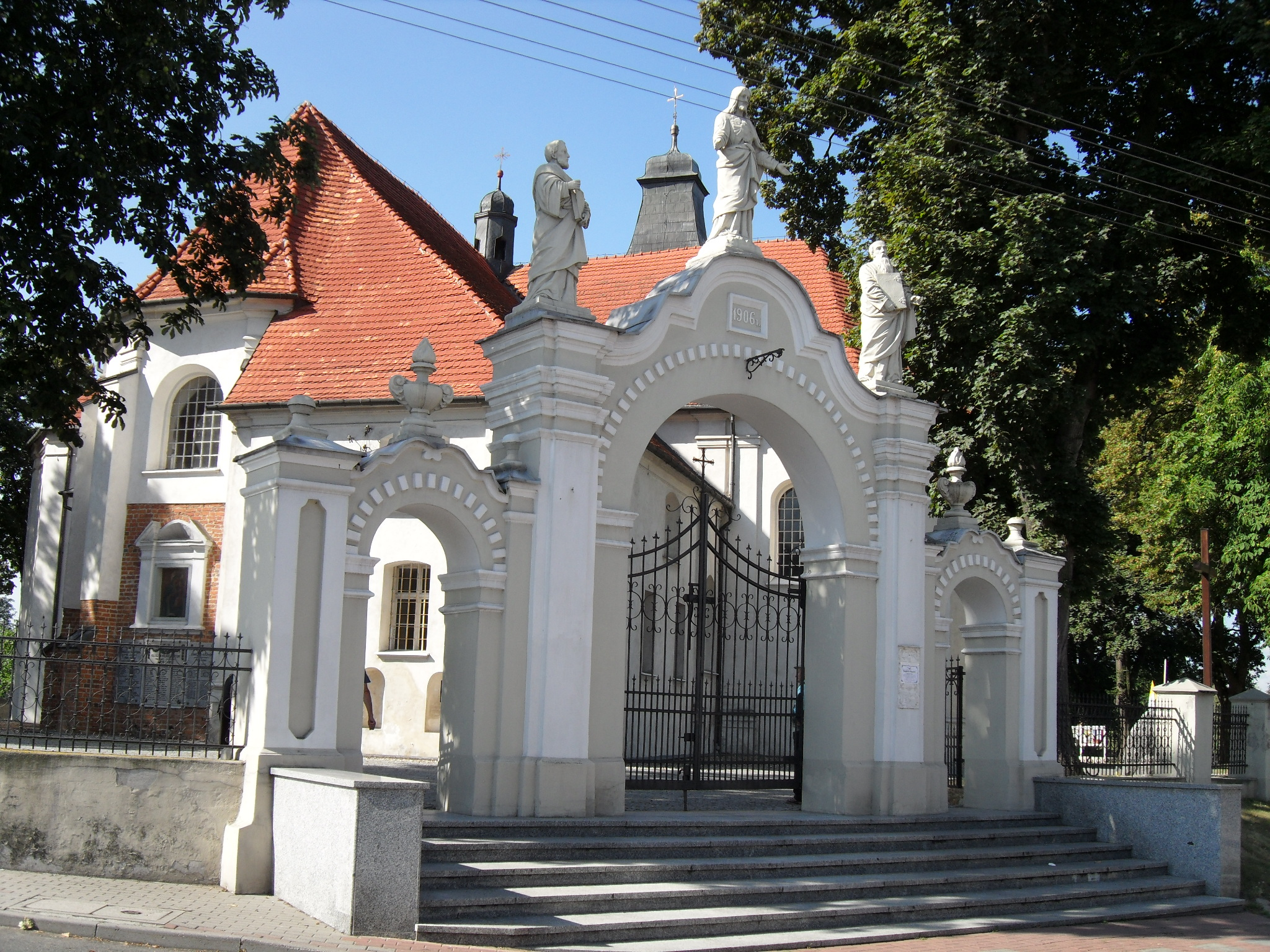
- Baroque Saints Peter and Paul church with the gate

- Flag Coat of arms

- Location within Poland
- Coordinates: 52°9′56″N 17°53′30″E
- Country: Poland
- Voivodeship: Greater Poland
- County: Słupca
- Gmina: Zagórów
- First mentioned: 1240
- Town rights: 1407/1445

Area
  - Total: 3.44 km^{2} (1.33 sq mi)

Population (2010)
  - Total: 2,985
  - Density: 868/km^{2} (2,250/sq mi)
- Time zone: UTC+1 (CET)
  - Summer (DST): UTC+2 (CEST)
- Postal code: 62-410
- Vehicle registration: PSL
- Website: http://www.zagorow.pl

Zagórów [zaˈɡuruf] is a town in Słupca County, Greater Poland Voivodeship, in central Poland, with 2,985 inhabitants (2010).

== History ==
The town's name is of Old Polish origin and comes from the word zagór. The oldest known mention of the settlement comes from a document from 1240. Zagórów received town rights from King Władysław II Jagiełło in 1407, however, these rights were implemented only in 1445. It was a private church town, administratively located in the Konin County in the Kalisz Voivodeship in the Greater Poland Province of the Kingdom of Poland. The town suffered as a result of the 17th-century Polish–Swedish wars.

It was annexed by Prussia during the Second Partition of Poland in 1793. After the successful Greater Poland uprising of 1806, it was regained by Poles and included within the short-lived Duchy of Warsaw. After the duchy's dissolution, it passed to the Russian Partition of Poland in 1815. Polish insurgents were active in the area during the January Uprising in 1863, and a battle was fought in the nearby village of Myszaków. As part of anti-Polish repressions after the fallen uprising, the tsarist administration stripped Zagórów of its town rights in 1869. Town rights were restored in 1919, after Poland regained independence. In the interbellum the local economy revived. According to the 1921 census, the town had a population of 3,715, 87.3% Polish, 11.1% Jewish and 1.5% German by declared nationality.

=== World War II ===
During the German occupation of Poland (World War II), on November 21–22, 1939, 10 Polish inhabitants of Zagórów, former participants of the Polish Greater Poland uprising (1918–19), were murdered by the Germans in the forest in the nearby village of Grabina. In 1939–1941, the Germans carried out expulsions of Poles, who were either deported to the so-called General Government (German-occupied central Poland) or enslaved as forced labour, while their homes, shops and workshops were handed over to German colonists as part of the Lebensraum policy.

In 1940, the Germans forced Zagórów's 600 Jews into a ghetto and then resettled hundreds of Jews from other localities into the ghetto, without money, jobs, or places to live. Over 2,000 Jews were now in the ghetto, 10 to 15 people per room. In 1941, some were sent to a forced labor camp in the salt mines near Inowrocław. In late September 1941, all the Jews still in the ghetto were taken to the Kazimierz Biskupi Forest where they were murdered. Eyewitness testimonies document the horrific day where Germans were experimenting with mass killing methods. Only a few Zagórów Jews survived the war. After the war the town was restored to Poland.

== Demographics ==
Historical population

Year	Pop.	±%
1890	3,326	—
1897	2,980	−10.4%
1921	3,715	+24.7%
1931	3,945	+6.2%

Year	Pop.	±%
1939	4,389	+11.3%
1950	2,433	−44.6%
1960	2,420	−0.5%
2010	2,985	+23.3%
