= Trąbczyn B =

- Village
- Location within Poland
- Coordinates: 52°07′00″N 17°54′57″E
- Country: Poland
- Voivodeship: Greater Poland
- County: Słupca
- Gmina: Zagórów
- Population: 54

Trąbczyn B is a village in the administrative district of Gmina Zagórów, within Słupca County, Greater Poland Voivodeship, in west-central Poland.
