= Wincentowo, Słupca County =

Wincentowo
- Village
- Location within Poland
- Coordinates: 52°7′52″N 17°55′47″E
- Country: Poland
- Voivodeship: Greater Poland
- County: Słupca
- Gmina: Zagórów
- Population: 20

Wincentowo [vint͡sɛnˈtɔvɔ] is a village in the administrative district of Gmina Zagórów, within Słupca County, Greater Poland Voivodeship, in west-central Poland.
