= Adamierz, Greater Poland Voivodeship =

Adamierz
- Village
- Location within Poland
- Coordinates: 52°9′5″N 17°47′34″E
- Country: Poland
- Voivodeship: Greater Poland
- County: Słupca
- Gmina: Zagórów

Adamierz [aˈdamjɛʂ] is a village in the administrative district of Gmina Zagórów, within Słupca County, Greater Poland Voivodeship, in west-central Poland.
