= Villa Aida =

Coordinates: 52°07′13″N 20°43′28″E

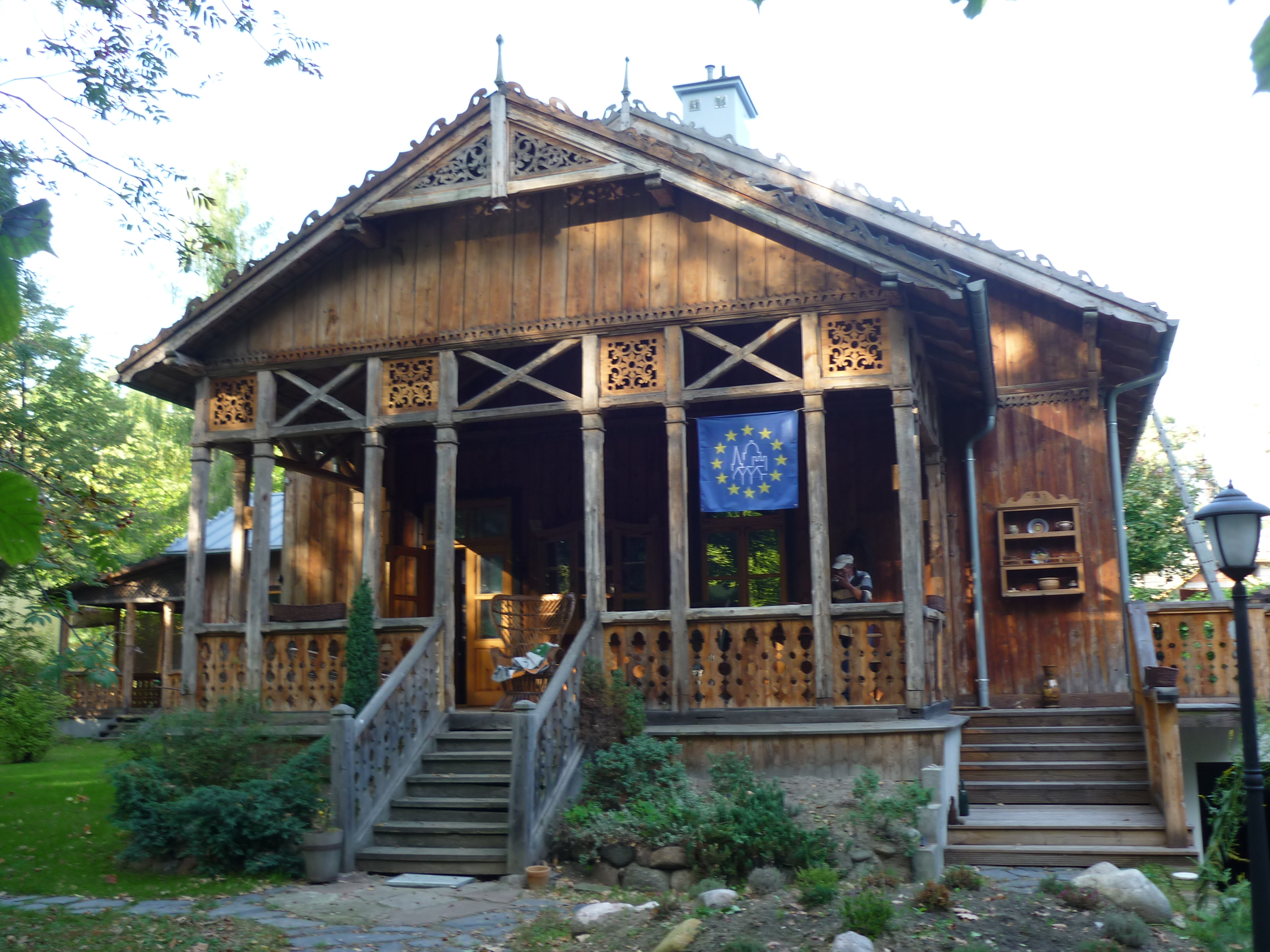
Willa Aida w Podkowie Leśnej

Villa Aida is a historic wooden building constructed in the 19th century, located at 7 Jarosława Iwaszkiewicz Street, Podkowa Leśna, Poland.

== History ==
The villa was built by Stanisław Wilhelm Lilpop circa 1900. During World War I, the villa was partially destroyed. Later, Anna Iwaszkiewicz (née Lilpop) and Jarosław Iwaszkiewicz used the villa. At that time, the villa served as a meeting place for the "Skamander" poetry group and others outside the group. In the 1930s, Aida changed ownership and operated as a guesthouse, where guests stayed for a few hours or a few days.

Following World War II, the villa changed ownership multiple times and gradually fell into abandonment. After the Klatów family acquired the villa, they partially renovated it. When Aida was owned by Wiesława Klata, it became the headquarters of the Alternative Foundation and was used for organizing theatre workshops and educational activities for children through the lens of art and artistic games.

Villa Aida was listed as a historical monument in 2010. Since 2011, the villa has served as the headquarters of a local history museum. Currently, the villa hosts performances, author meetings, concerts, exhibitions, and poetry evenings.
