= Włodzimirów, Słupca County =

Włodzimirów
- Village
- Location within Poland
- Coordinates: 52°07′11″N 17°53′39″E
- Country: Poland
- Voivodeship: Greater Poland
- County: Słupca
- Gmina: Zagórów

Włodzimirów [vwɔd͡ʑiˈmiruf] is a village in the administrative district of Gmina Zagórów, within Słupca County, Greater Poland Voivodeship, in west-central Poland.
