= Trąbczyn =

- Village
- Location within Poland
- Coordinates: 52°9′N 17°57′E
- Country: Poland
- Voivodeship: Greater Poland
- County: Słupca
- Gmina: Zagórów
- Population: 500

Trąbczyn [ˈtrɔmpt͡ʂɨn] is a village in the administrative district of Gmina Zagórów, within Słupca County, Greater Poland Voivodeship, in west-central Poland.
