= Stanisław Kostanecki =

Polish chemist (1860–1910)

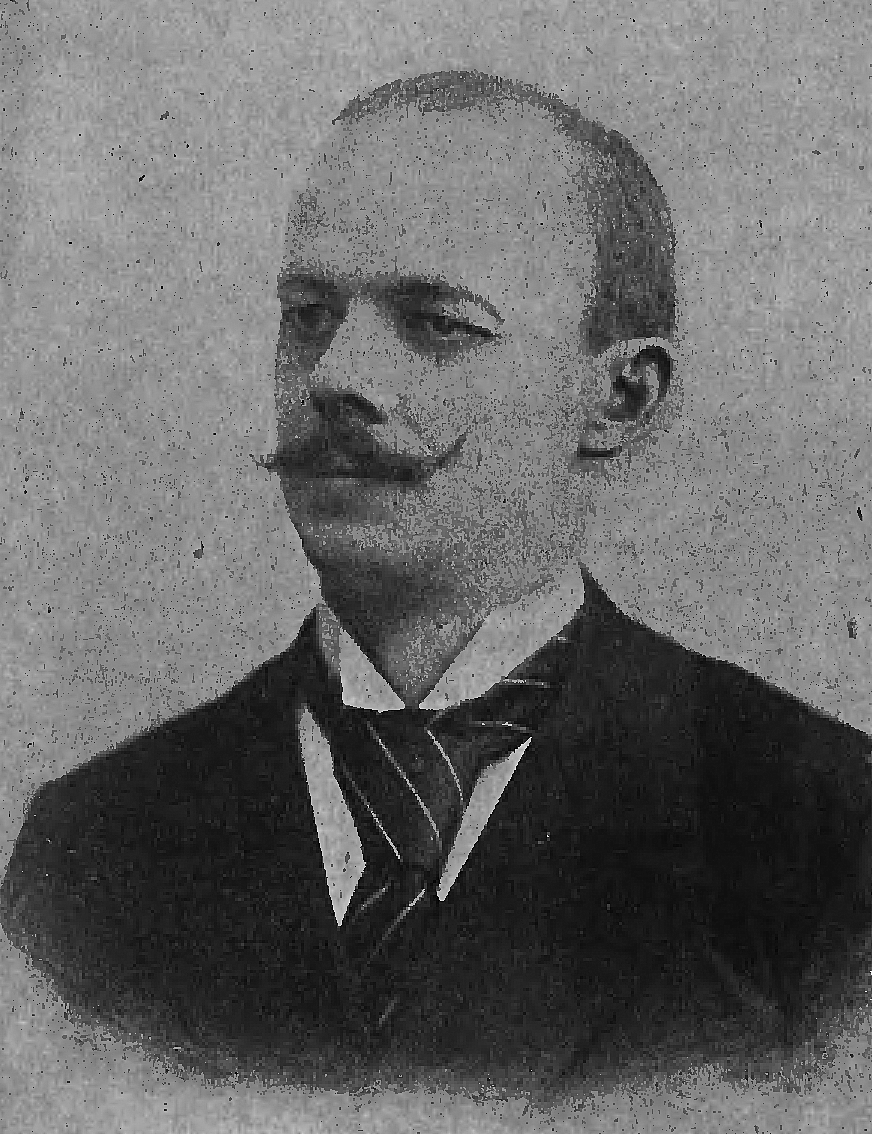

Stanisław Kostanecki (born 16 April 1860 in Myszaków, now in Poland then Kingdom of Prussia – 15 November 1910 in Würzburg) was a Polish organic chemist, professor who pioneered in vegetable dye chemistry e.g. curcumin. He is best known for discovering Kostanecki acylation, which was named after him.

In 1896, he developed the theory of dyes and studied the natural vegetable dyes. Among his many students were scientists Kazimierz Funk and Wiktor Lampe.
