= Podkowa Leśna =

Garden city in Poland

- Garden city
- Miasto-ogród Podkowa Leśna
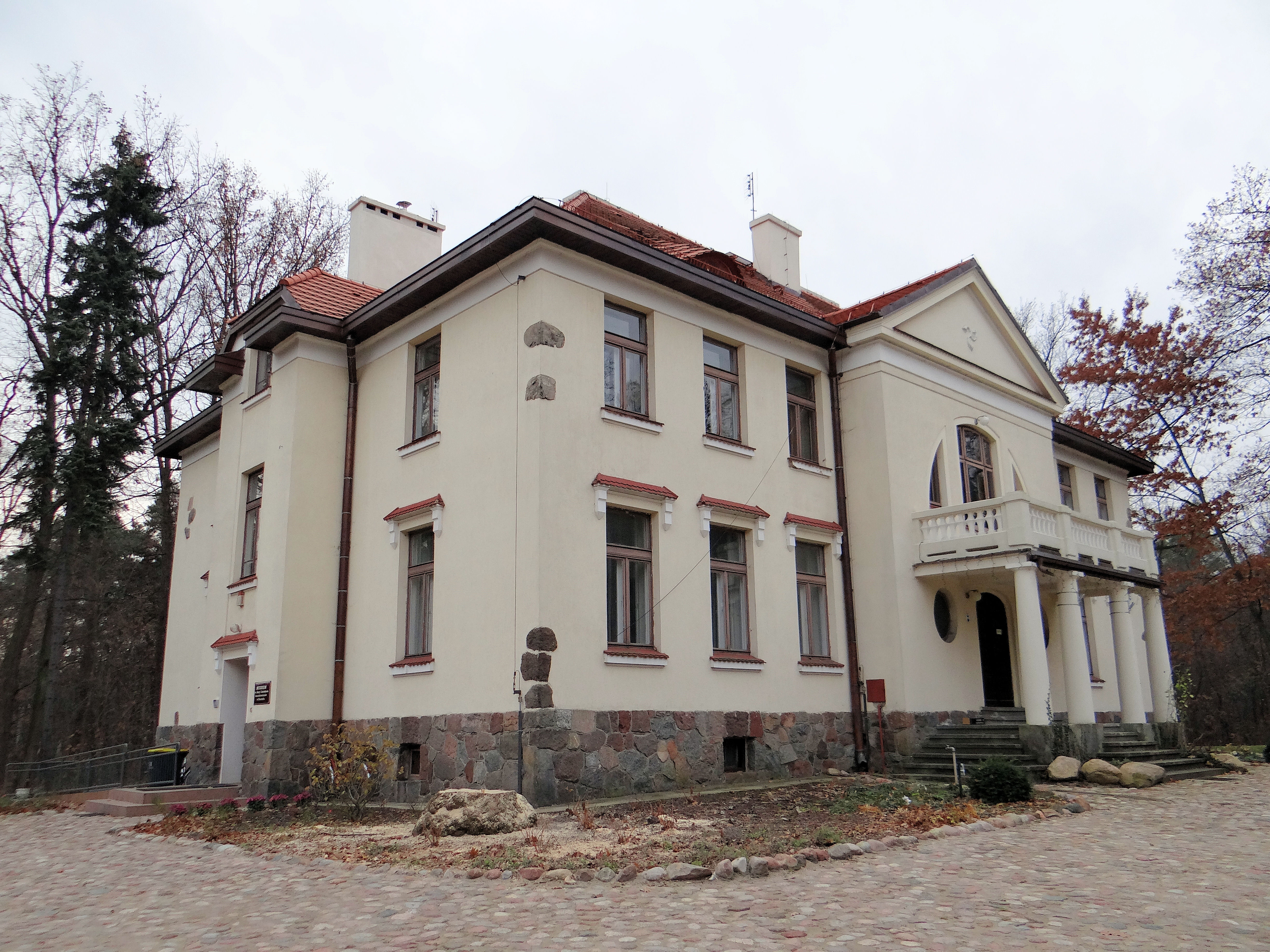
- Villa Stawisko, former home of writer Jarosław Iwaszkiewicz

- Coat of arms

- Location within Poland
- Coordinates: 52°7′N 20°44′E
- Country: Poland
- Voivodship: Masovian
- County: Grodzisk
- Gmina: Podkowa Leśna (urban gmina)
- Established: 19th century
- Town rights: 1969

Government
  - Mayor: Magdalena Eckhoff

Area
  - Total: 10.1 km^{2} (3.9 sq mi)

Population (2008)
  - Total: 3,822
  - Density: 378/km^{2} (980/sq mi)
- Time zone: UTC+1 (CET)
  - Summer (DST): UTC+2 (CEST)
- Postal code: 05-807
- Area code: +48 22
- Car plates: WGM
- Website: podkowalesna.pl

Podkowa Leśna [pɔtˈkɔva ˈlɛɕna] (lit. 'Forest Horseshoe', in full: Miasto-ogród Podkowa Leśna – transl. Podkowa Leśna Garden City) is a town in Grodzisk County, Masovian Voivodeship of Poland and located within the territory of the Młochowskie Forests. The town also has the status of gmina, meaning "commune". Population – ca. 4000.

Located near Warsaw, the town contains a number of villas from the interwar period as well as newer modern family homes and larger residences. Forests border the town on three sides (east, south, and north). Peacocks are known to wander freely in the area. Some residents refer to it as “Warsaw’s bedroom” because of its quieter natural surroundings and proximity to the capital.

== History ==
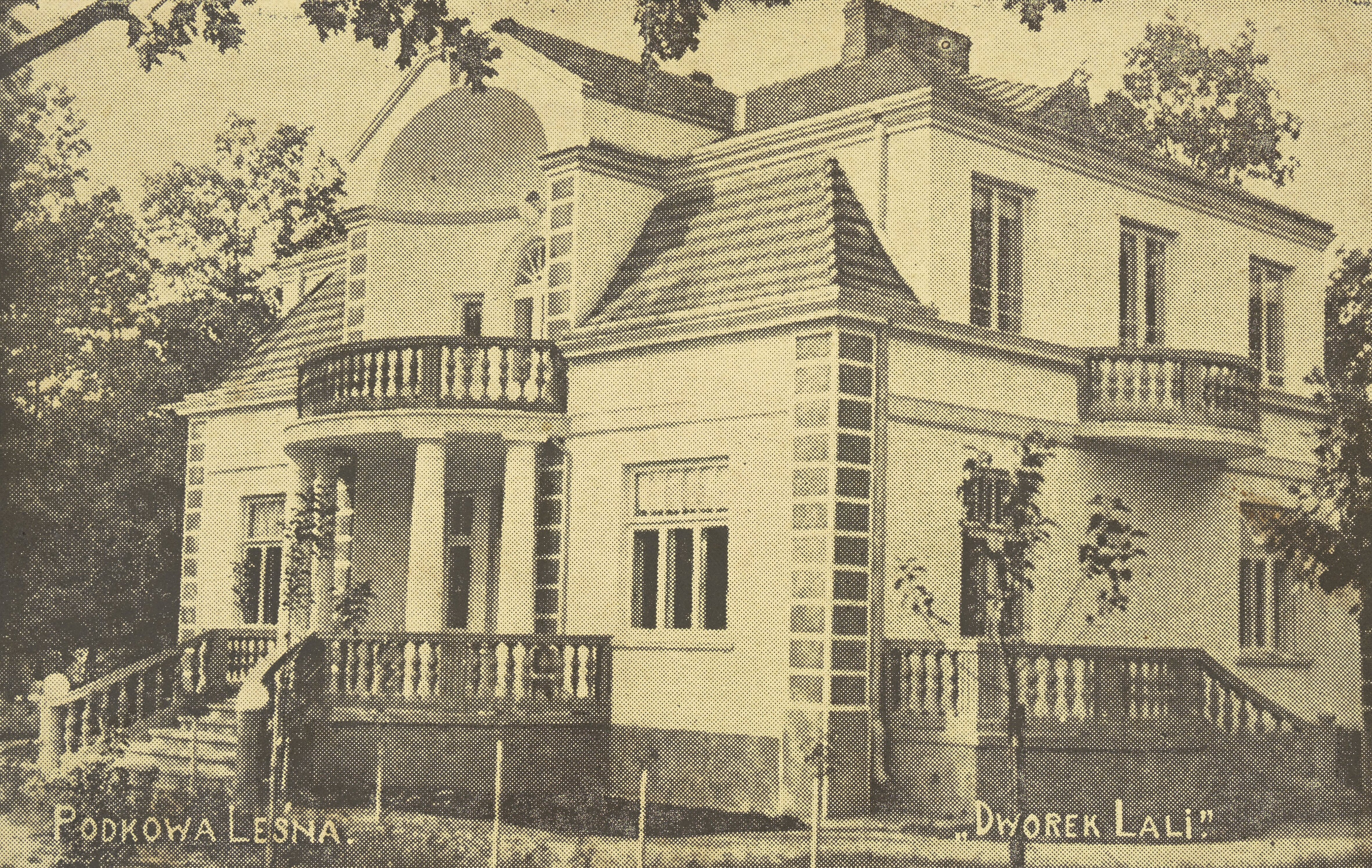
A villa in 1930

The town was designed in 1925 by Anthony Jawornicki and is based on the principles of the garden city movement. Its growth was aided by the construction of the Warsaw Commuter Railway in 1927 which has 3 stations located in the town. Due to the town being served by this light railway line, it is easily accessed from central Warsaw.

On 1 September 1939, the first day of World War II, bombs fell on Podkowa Leśna that the Luftwaffe had intended for Warsaw. Afterwards, it was occupied by Germany until 17 January 1945, when the Soviets entered Podkowa Leśna. In 1943, local Poles took in a number of kidnapped Polish children from the Zamość region, which were either bought out or secretly taken off German trains. Some of the Poles who were expelled from Warsaw after the Warsaw Uprising relocated to Podkowa Leśna in 1944.

On 1 January 1969, it obtained town status.

It is historically has attracted residents from the arts, culture and politics and is increasingly popular with wealthy professionals and business people. The town is one of the wealthiest in Poland.

== Town layout ==
There is a small town centre consisting of numerous amenities such as a church, bank, post office, wine shop, numerous delicatessens, police station, veterinarian and numerous restaurants. Just beyond the edge of the forest to the North West is a modern shopping centre called "Galeria Podkowa".

== Education ==
There are 3 schools in the town, junior, primary and high school.

== Popular culture ==
The 2021 movie "In For a Murder" was set in Podkowa Leśna

== Smart City ==
In 2018, Podkowa Leśna was selected as a model Orange Smart City. Fibre to the property FTTP is available to residents and offers speeds of up to 1 GB/s.

== Gallery ==
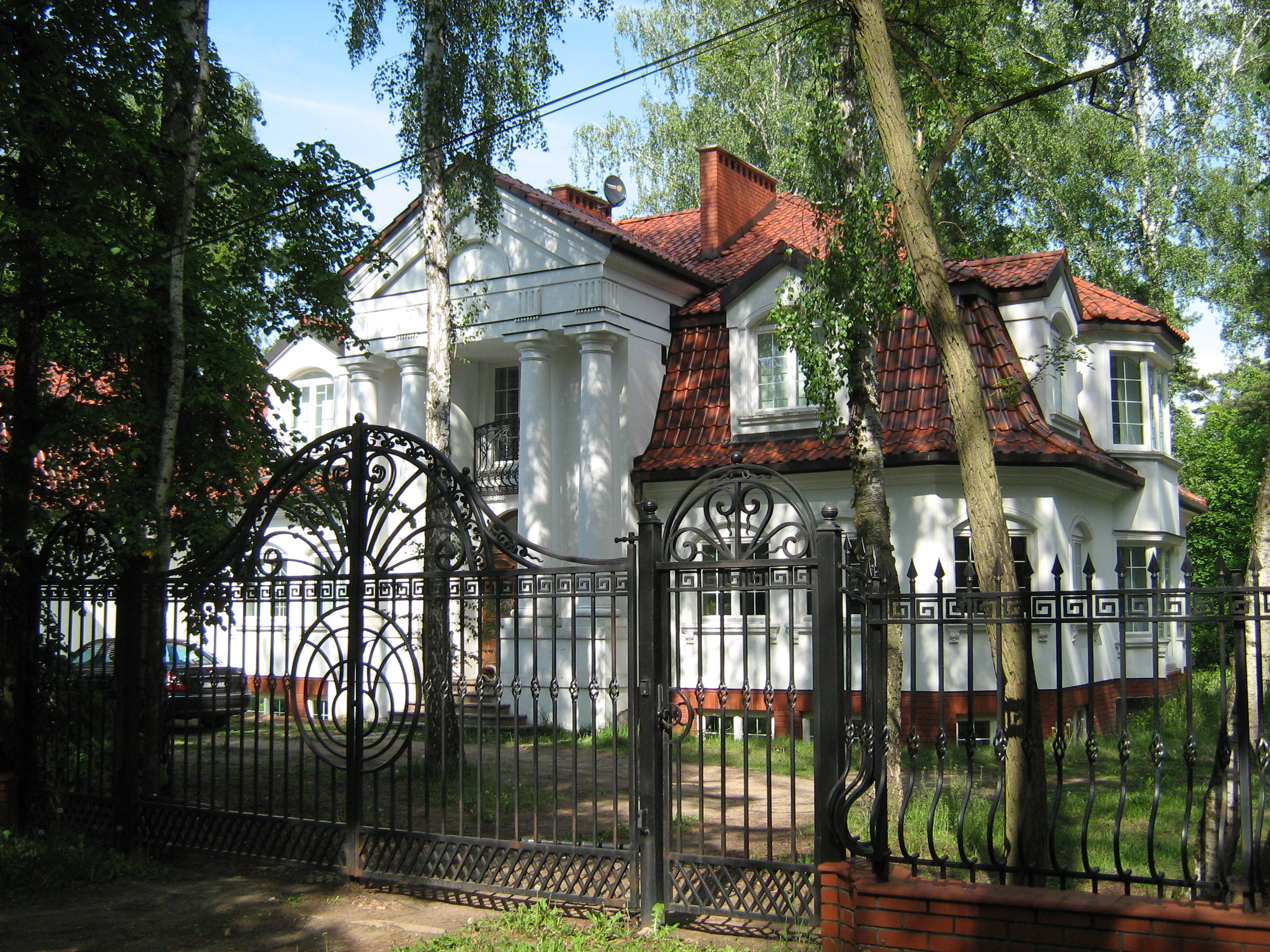
A villa in Podkowa Leśna

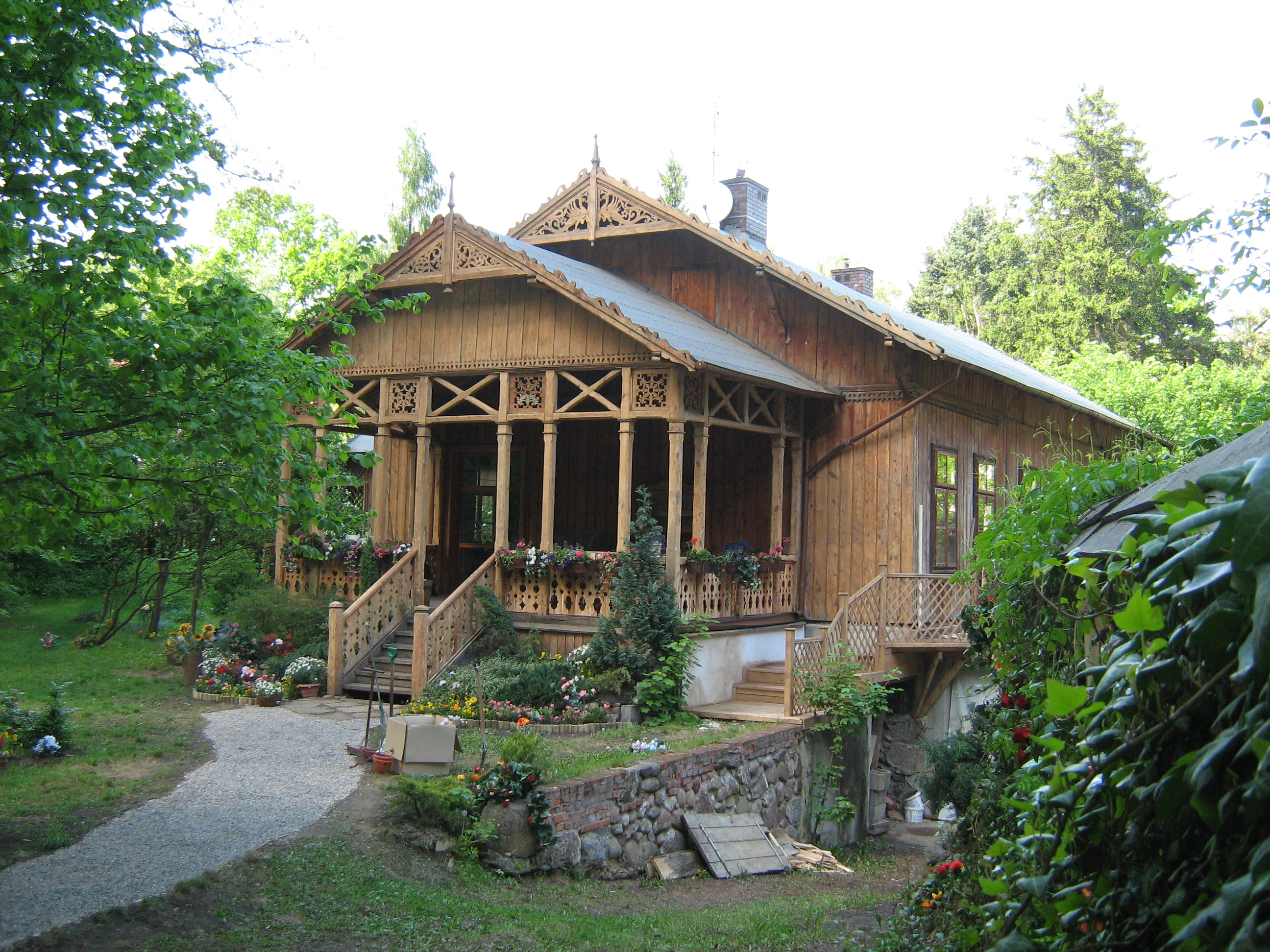
Villa Aida

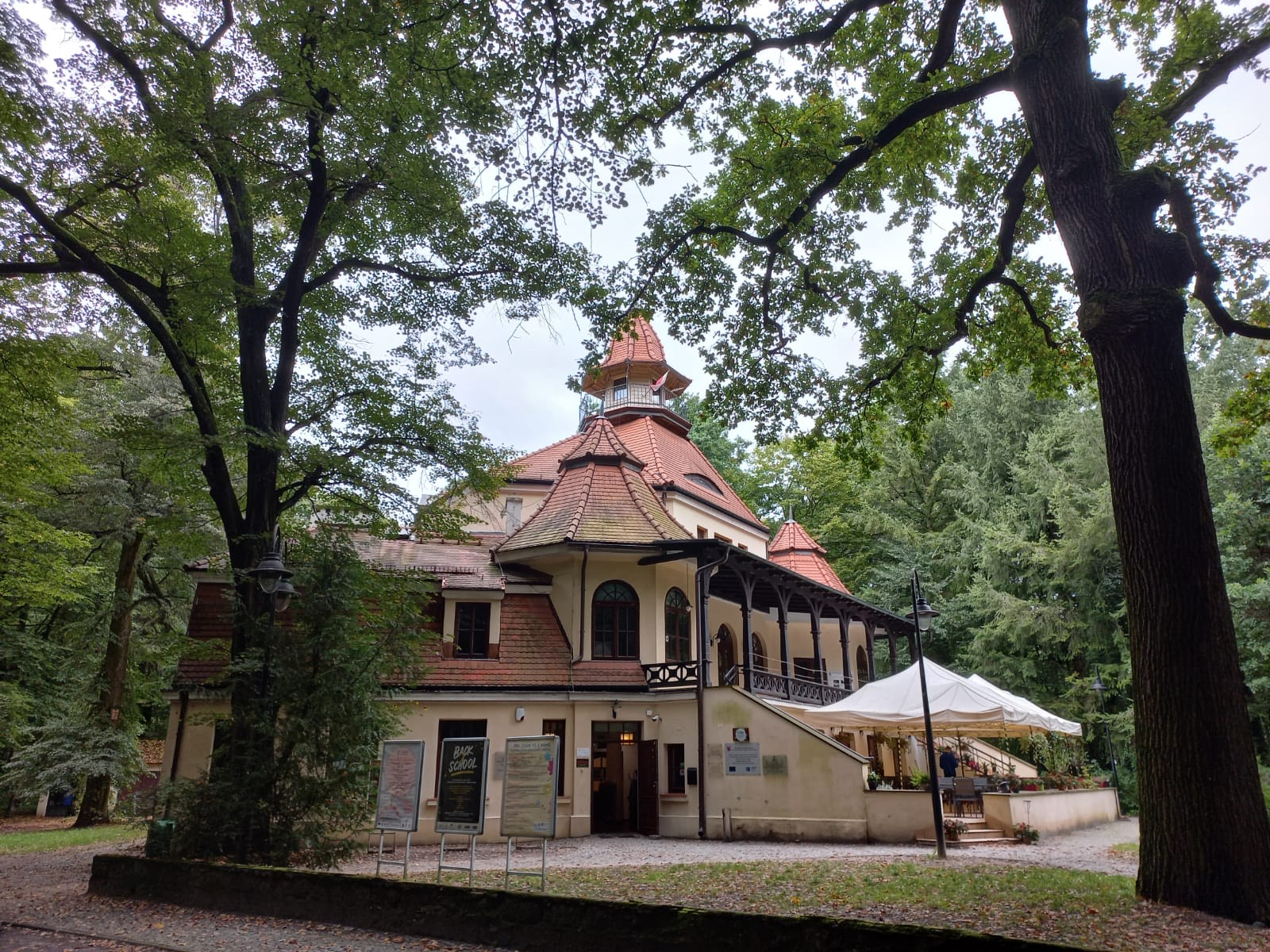
Former casino

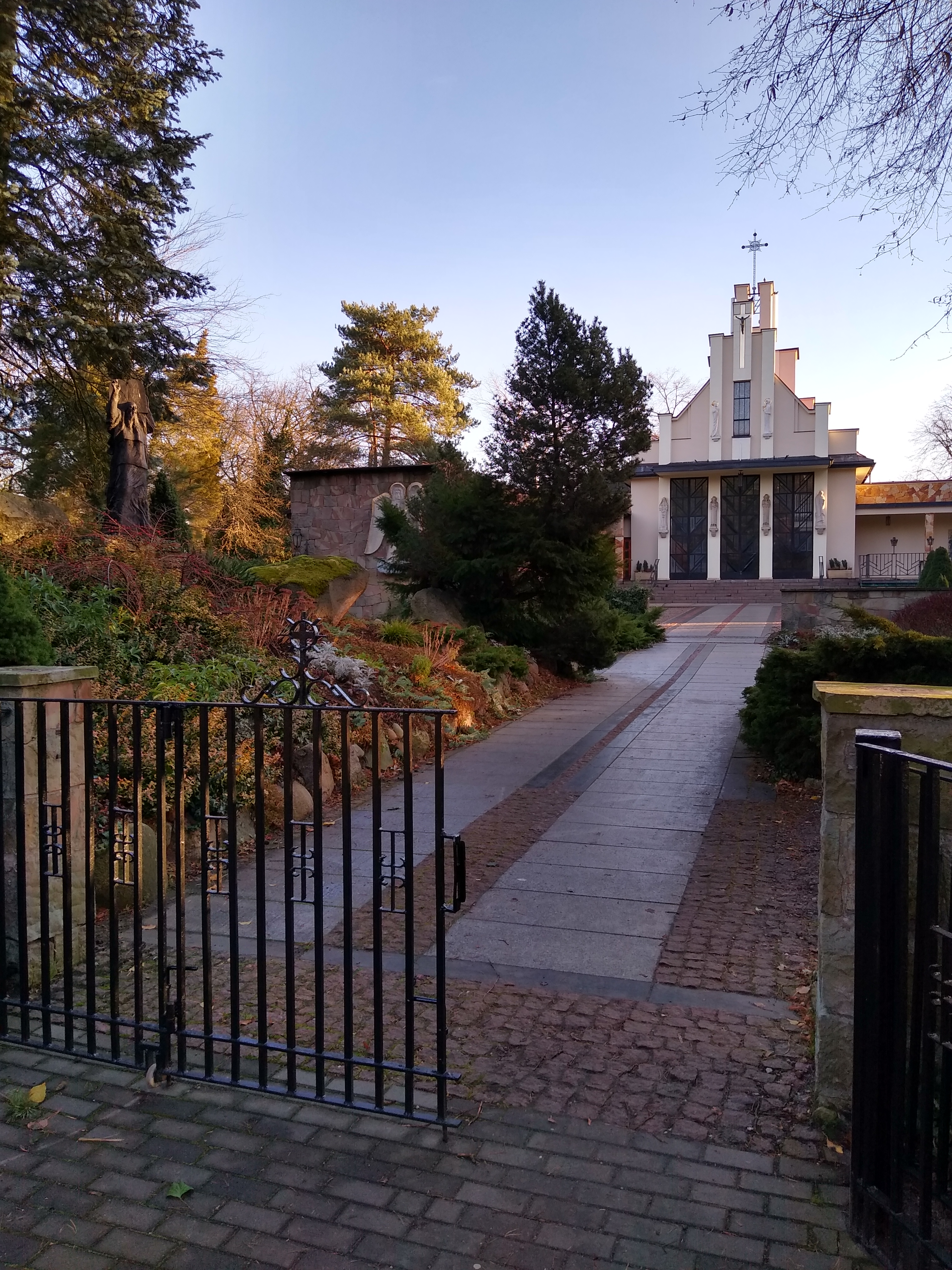
St Christopher Church

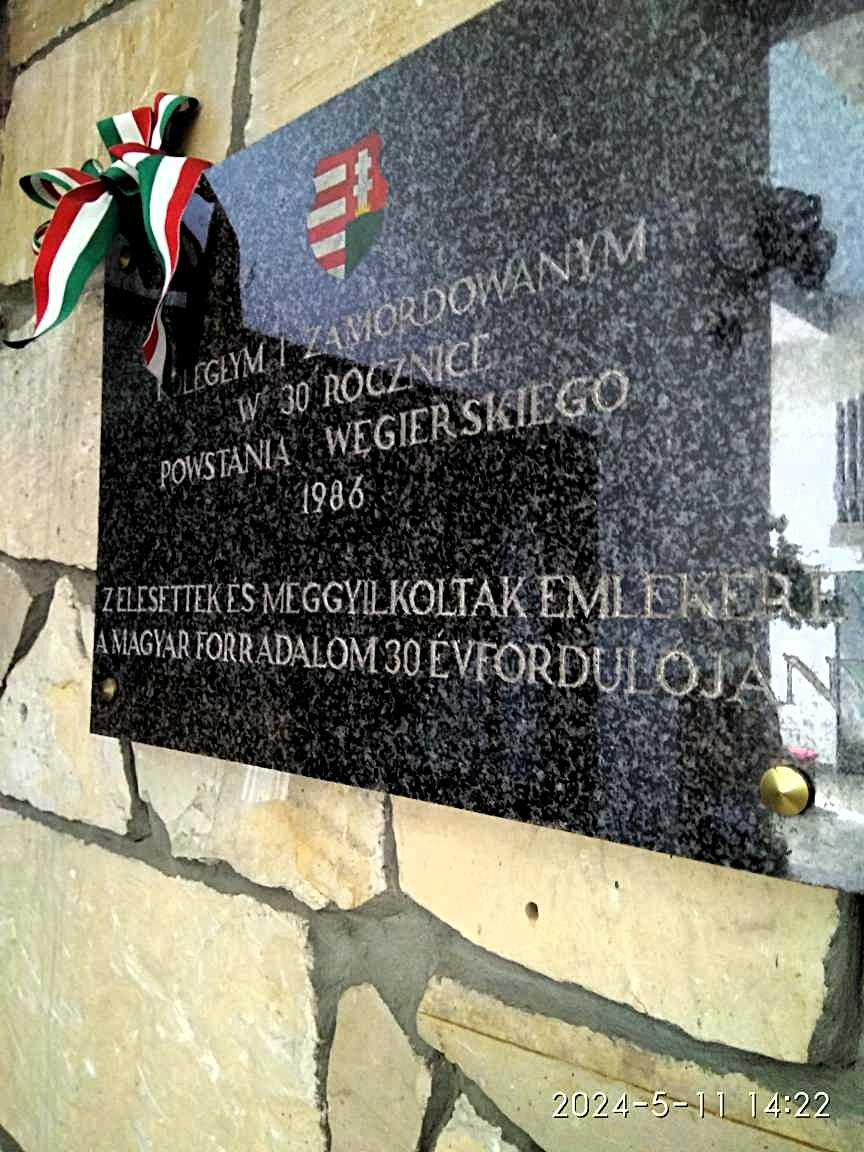
Plaque commemorating the 30th anniversary of the Hungarian Revolution of 1956 at the St Christopher Church

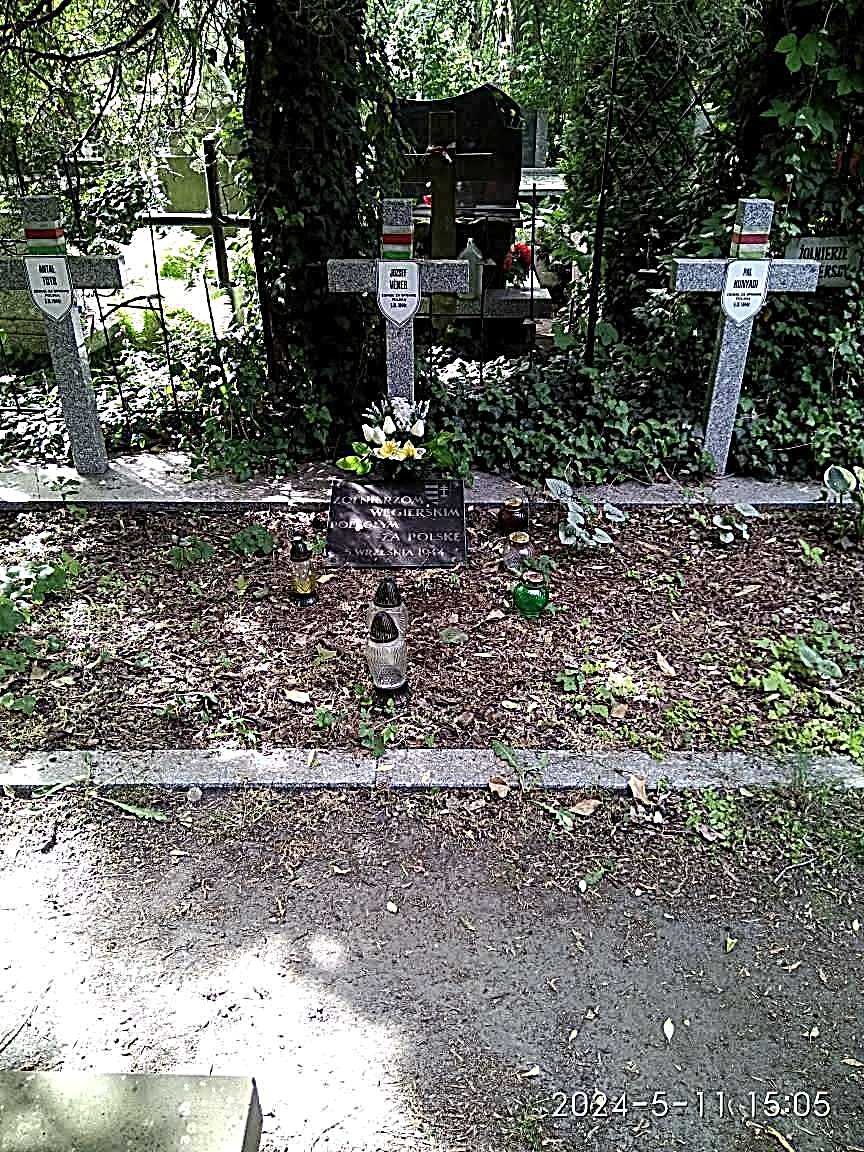
Hungarian soldiers tombs from WW2

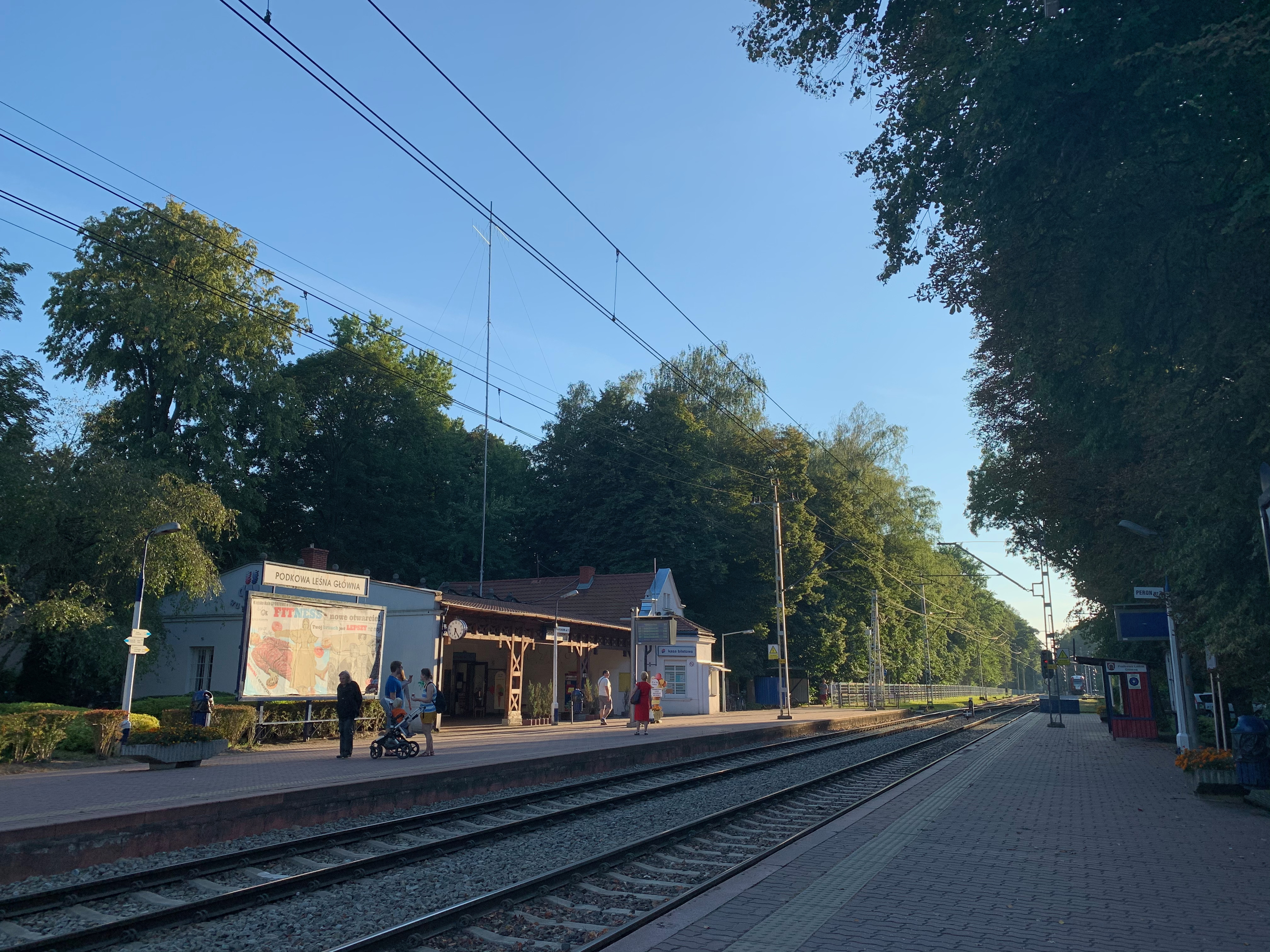
Main railway station

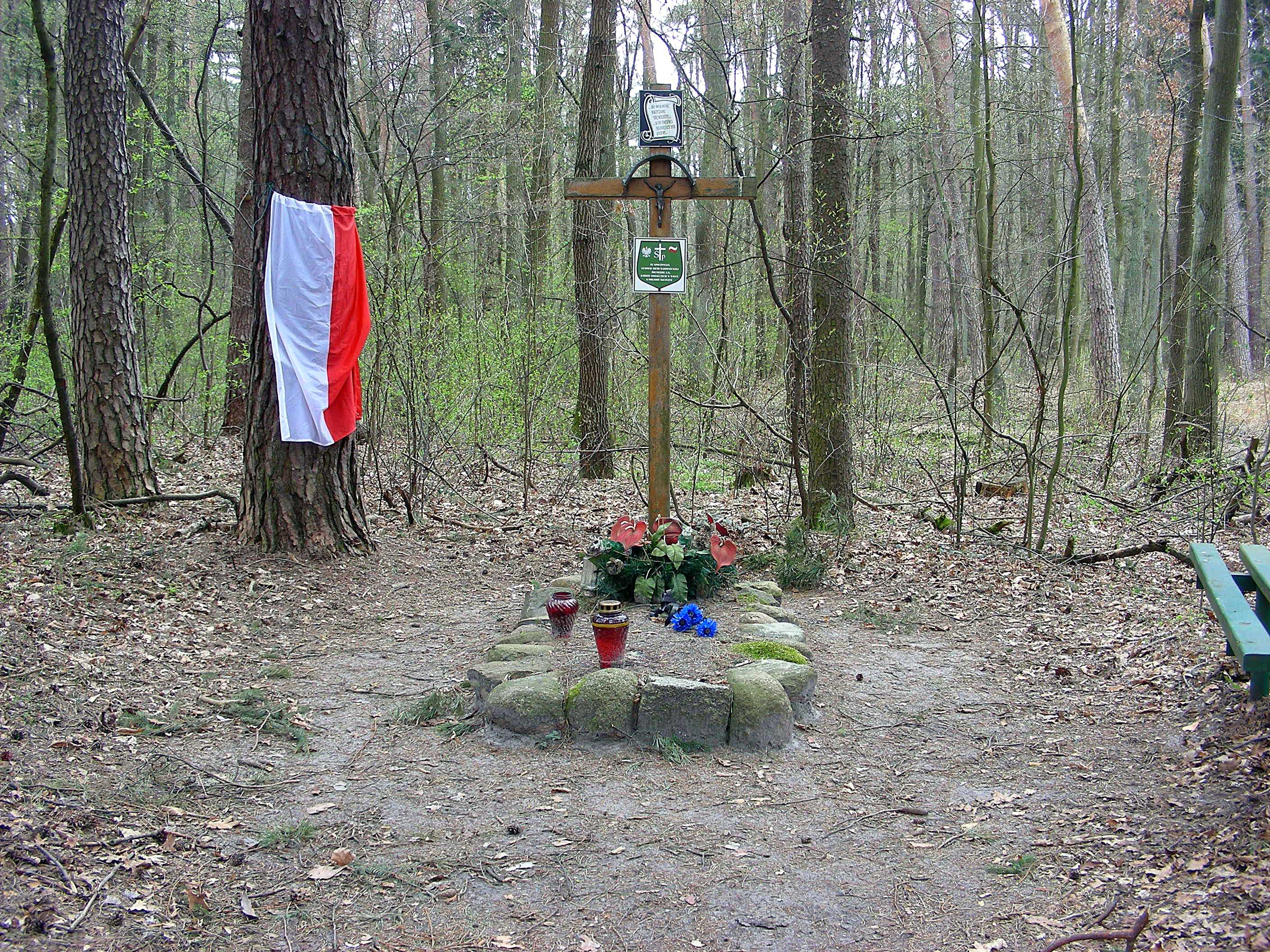
Tomb of The Unknown Home Army Partisans near the Dębak Forester's Lodge (at the neighbouring "Lasy Młochowskie" area)

== See also ==
- Stanisław Wilhelm Lilpop, founder of the town
- Warsaw Commuter Railway
