= Stanisławów, Greater Poland Voivodeship =

Stanisławów
- Village
- Location within Poland
- Coordinates: 52°6′51″N 17°58′47″E
- Country: Poland
- Voivodeship: Greater Poland
- County: Słupca
- Gmina: Zagórów

Population
  - Total: 130
- Time zone: UTC+1 (CET)
  - Summer (DST): UTC+2 (CEST)
- Vehicle registration: PSL

Stanisławów [staniˈswavuf] is a village in the administrative district of Gmina Zagórów, within Słupca County, Greater Poland Voivodeship, in central Poland.
