= Szetlewek =

- Village
- Location within Poland
- Coordinates: 52°7′N 18°0′E
- Country: Poland
- Voivodeship: Greater Poland
- County: Słupca
- Gmina: Zagórów

Szetlewek [ʂɛˈtlɛvɛk] is a village in the administrative district of Gmina Zagórów, within Słupca County, Greater Poland Voivodeship, in west-central Poland.
