= Anielewo, Słupca County =

Anielewo
- Village
- Location within Poland
- Coordinates: 52°6′N 17°49′E
- Country: Poland
- Voivodeship: Greater Poland
- County: Słupca
- Gmina: Zagórów
- Population: 100

Anielewo [aɲɛˈlɛvɔ] is a village in the administrative district of Gmina Zagórów, within Słupca County, Greater Poland Voivodeship, in west-central Poland.
