= Łazińsk Pierwszy =

- Village
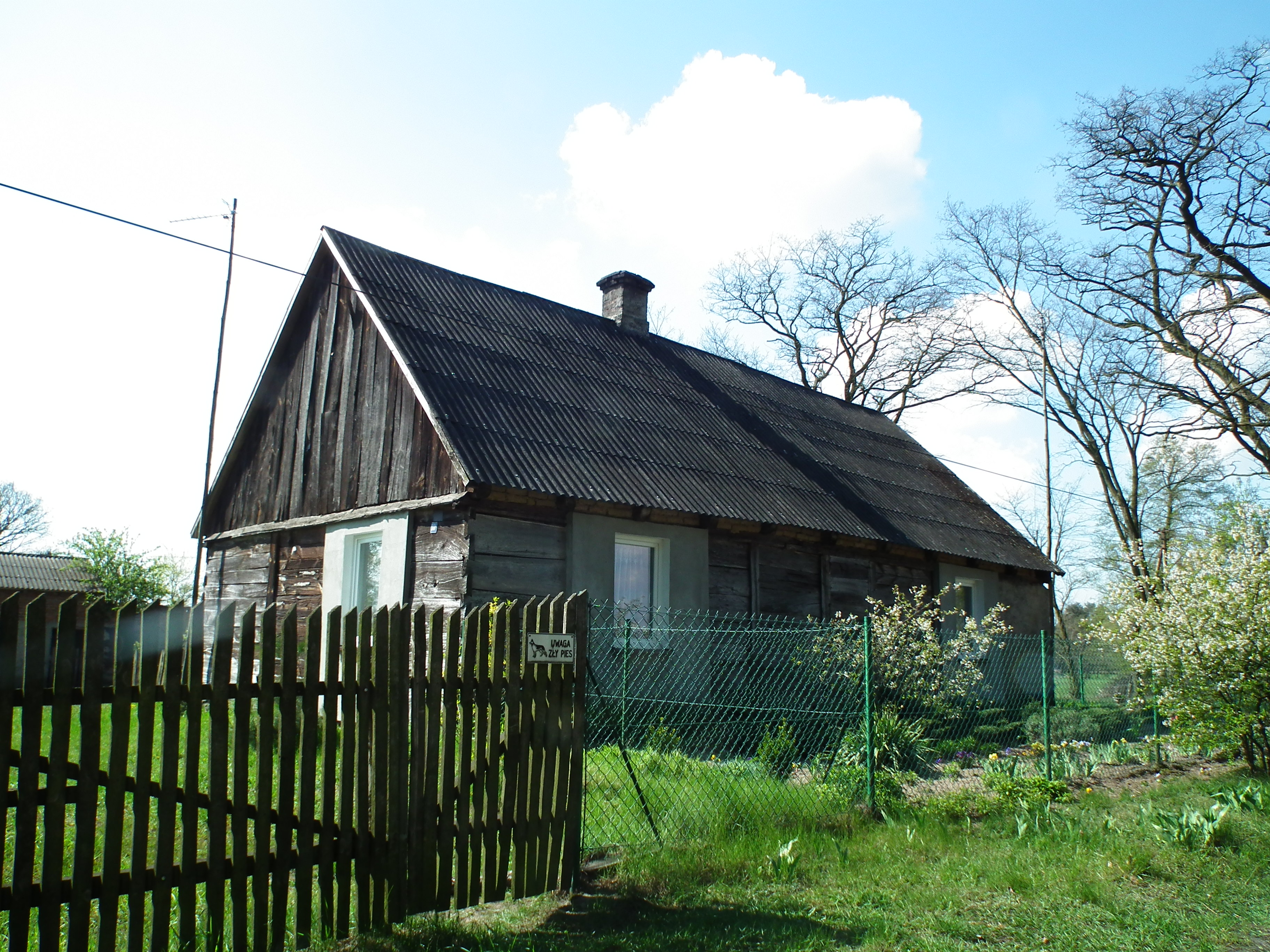

- Location within Poland
- Coordinates: 52°06′09″N 17°53′33″E
- Country: Poland
- Voivodeship: Greater Poland
- County: Słupca
- Gmina: Zagórów

Łazińsk Pierwszy [ˈwaʑiɲsk ˈpjɛrfʂɨ] is a village in the administrative district of Gmina Zagórów, within Słupca County, Greater Poland Voivodeship, in west-central Poland.
