= Oleśnica, Słupca County =

Oleśnica
- Village
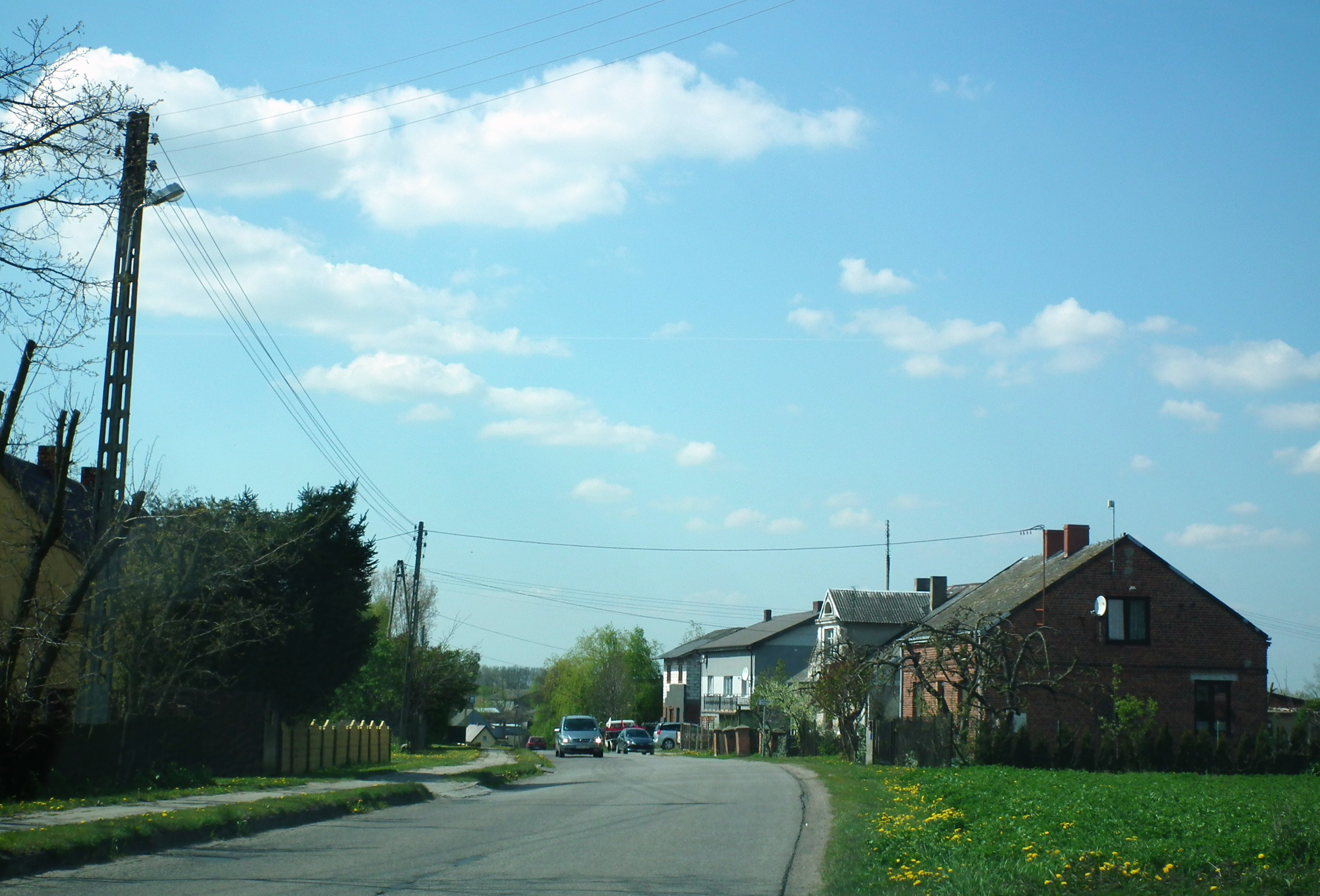

- Location within Poland
- Coordinates: 52°10′N 17°56′E
- Country: Poland
- Voivodeship: Greater Poland
- County: Słupca
- Gmina: Zagórów
- Time zone: UTC+1 (CET)
  - Summer (DST): UTC+2 (CEST)

Oleśnica (Polish: [ɔlɛˈɕɲit͡sa]) is a village in the administrative district of Gmina Zagórów, within Słupca County, Greater Poland Voivodeship, in central Poland.
