= Przybysław, Słupca County =

Przybysław
- Village
- Location within Poland
- Coordinates: 52°08′00″N 17°56′45″E
- Country: Poland
- Voivodeship: Greater Poland
- County: Słupca
- Gmina: Zagórów
- Population: 22

Przybysław [pʂɨˈbɨswaf] is a village in the administrative district of Gmina Zagórów, within Słupca County, Greater Poland Voivodeship, in west-central Poland.
