= Zalesie, Słupca County =

Zalesie
- Village
- Location within Poland
- Coordinates: 52°8′43″N 17°55′34″E
- Country: Poland
- Voivodeship: Greater Poland
- County: Słupca
- Gmina: Zagórów

Zalesie [zaˈlɛɕɛ] is a village in the administrative district of Gmina Zagórów, within Słupca County, Greater Poland Voivodeship, in west-central Poland.
