= Wymysłów, Słupca County =

Wymysłów
- Settlement
- Location within Poland
- Coordinates: 52°10′51″N 17°53′59″E
- Country: Poland
- Voivodeship: Greater Poland
- County: Słupca
- Gmina: Zagórów
- Population: 17

Wymysłów [vɨˈmɨswuf] is a settlement in the administrative district of Gmina Zagórów, within Słupca County, Greater Poland Voivodeship, in west-central Poland.
