= Łomów =

- Village
- Location within Poland
- Coordinates: 52°07′06″N 17°51′06″E
- Country: Poland
- Voivodeship: Greater Poland
- County: Słupca
- Gmina: Zagórów

Łomów [ˈwɔmuf] is a village in the administrative district of Gmina Zagórów, within Słupca County, Greater Poland Voivodeship, in west-central Poland.
