= Grabina, Gmina Zagórów =

Grabina
- Settlement
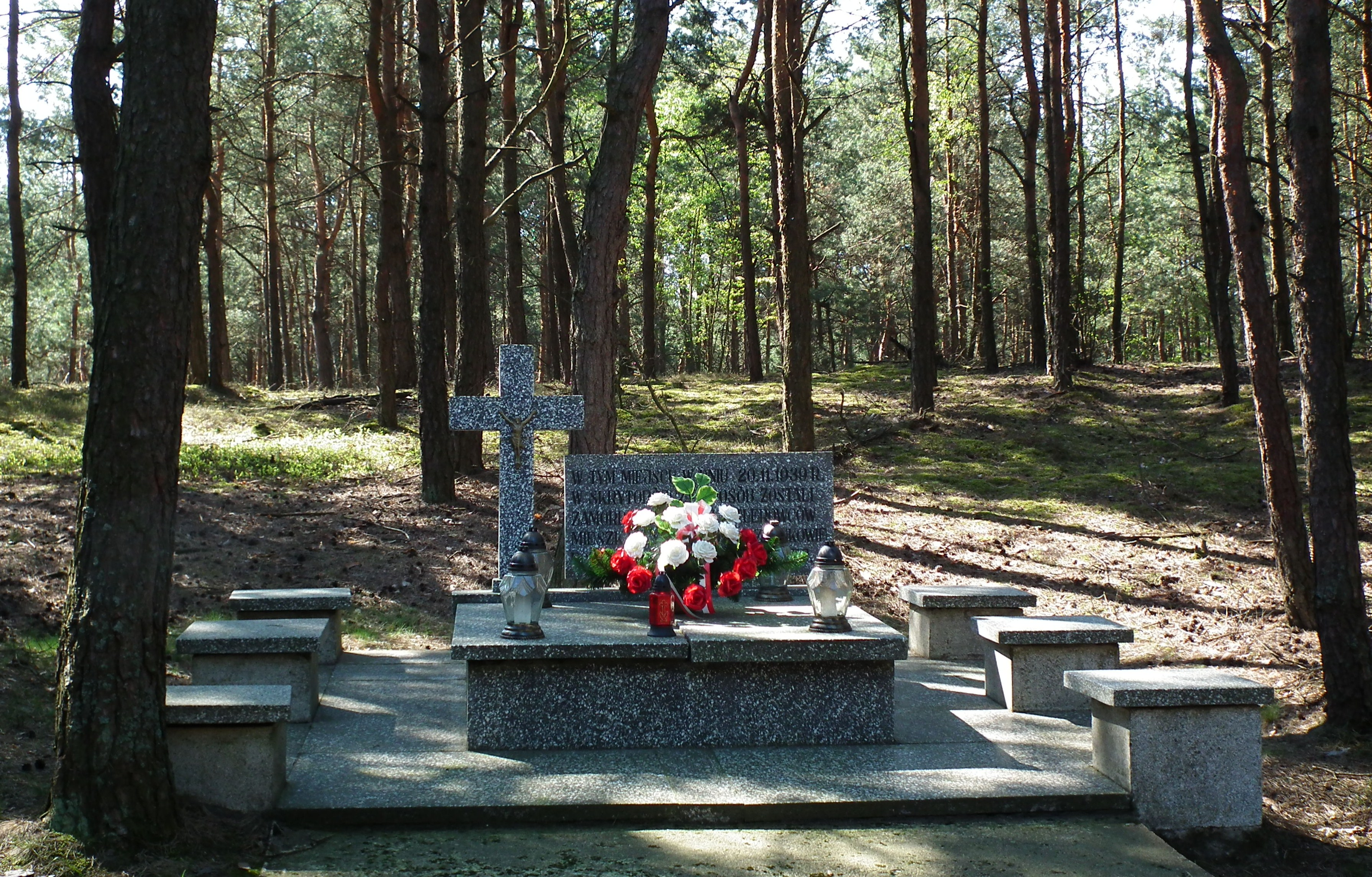
- Memorial at the site of a German massacre of Poles in November 1939

- Location within Poland
- Coordinates: 52°07′00″N 17°55′27″E
- Country: Poland
- Voivodeship: Greater Poland
- County: Słupca
- Gmina: Zagórów
- Population: 8
- Time zone: UTC+1 (CET)
  - Summer (DST): UTC+2 (CEST)

Grabina [ɡraˈbina] is a settlement in the administrative district of Gmina Zagórów, within Słupca County, Greater Poland Voivodeship, in west-central Poland.

Grabina is one of the sites of Nazi crimes against the Polish nation. During the German occupation of Poland (World War II), on 21–22 November 1939, ten Polish inhabitants of the nearby town of Zagórów, former participants of the Polish Greater Poland uprising (1918–19), were murdered by the Germans in the forest near the village. There is a monument at the site of the massacre.

The village was a place of bog iron mining.
