= Chruściki, Greater Poland Voivodeship =

Chruściki
- Village
- Location within Poland
- Coordinates: 52°9′49″N 18°0′6″E
- Country: Poland
- Voivodeship: Greater Poland
- County: Słupca
- Gmina: Zagórów
- Population: 30

Chruściki [xruɕˈt͡ɕiki] is a village in the administrative district of Gmina Zagórów, within Słupca County, Greater Poland Voivodeship, in west-central Poland.
