= Gmina Zagórów =

Gmina Zagórów Zagórów Commune
- Gmina
- Coat of arms
- Interactive map of Gmina Zagórów
- Coordinates (Zagórów): 52°9′56″N 17°53′30″E
- Country: Poland
- Voivodeship: Greater Poland
- County: Słupca
- Seat: Zagórów

Area
  - Total: 159.59 km^{2} (61.62 sq mi)

Population (2006)
  - Total: 9,073
  - Density: 56.85/km^{2} (147.2/sq mi)
  - Urban: 2,932
  - Rural: 6,141
- Website: http://www.zagorow.pl

Gmina Zagórów is an urban-rural gmina (administrative district) in Słupca County, Greater Poland Voivodeship, in west-central Poland. Its seat is the town of Zagórów, which lies approximately 16 kilometres (10 mi) south of Słupca and 72 km (45 mi) east of the regional capital Poznań.

The gmina covers an area of 159.59 square kilometres (61.6 sq mi), and as of 2006 its total population is 9,073 (out of which the population of Zagórów amounts to 2,932, and the population of the rural part of the gmina is 6,141).

The gmina contains part of the protected area called Warta Landscape Park.

== Villages ==
Apart from the town of Zagórów, Gmina Zagórów contains the villages and settlements of Adamierz, Anielewo, Augustynów, Bukowe, Chruściki, Długa Górka, Drzewce, Grabina, Grądzeń, Huta Łukomska, Imielno, Kirchol, Kopojno, Kopojno-Parcele, Kościołków, Koszelewska Łąka, Łazińsk Drugi, Łazińsk Pierwszy, Łazy, Łomów, Łukom, Mariantów, Michalinów near Oleśnica, Michalinów near Trąbczyn, Myszaków, Myszakówek, Nowa Wieś, Olchowo, Oleśnica, Oleśnica-Folwark, Osiny, Podbiel, Przybysław, Skokum, Smoleniec, Stanisławów, Stawisko, Szetlew, Szetlewek, Tarszewo, Trąbczyn, Trąbczyn B, Trąbczyn D, Trąbczyn Dworski, Wincentowo, Włodzimirów, Wrąbczyn, Wrąbczyn Górski, Wymysłów and Zalesie.

== Neighbouring gminas ==
Gmina Zagórów is bordered by the gminas of Gizałki, Grodziec, Lądek, Pyzdry and Rzgów.
