= Łazińsk Drugi =

- Village
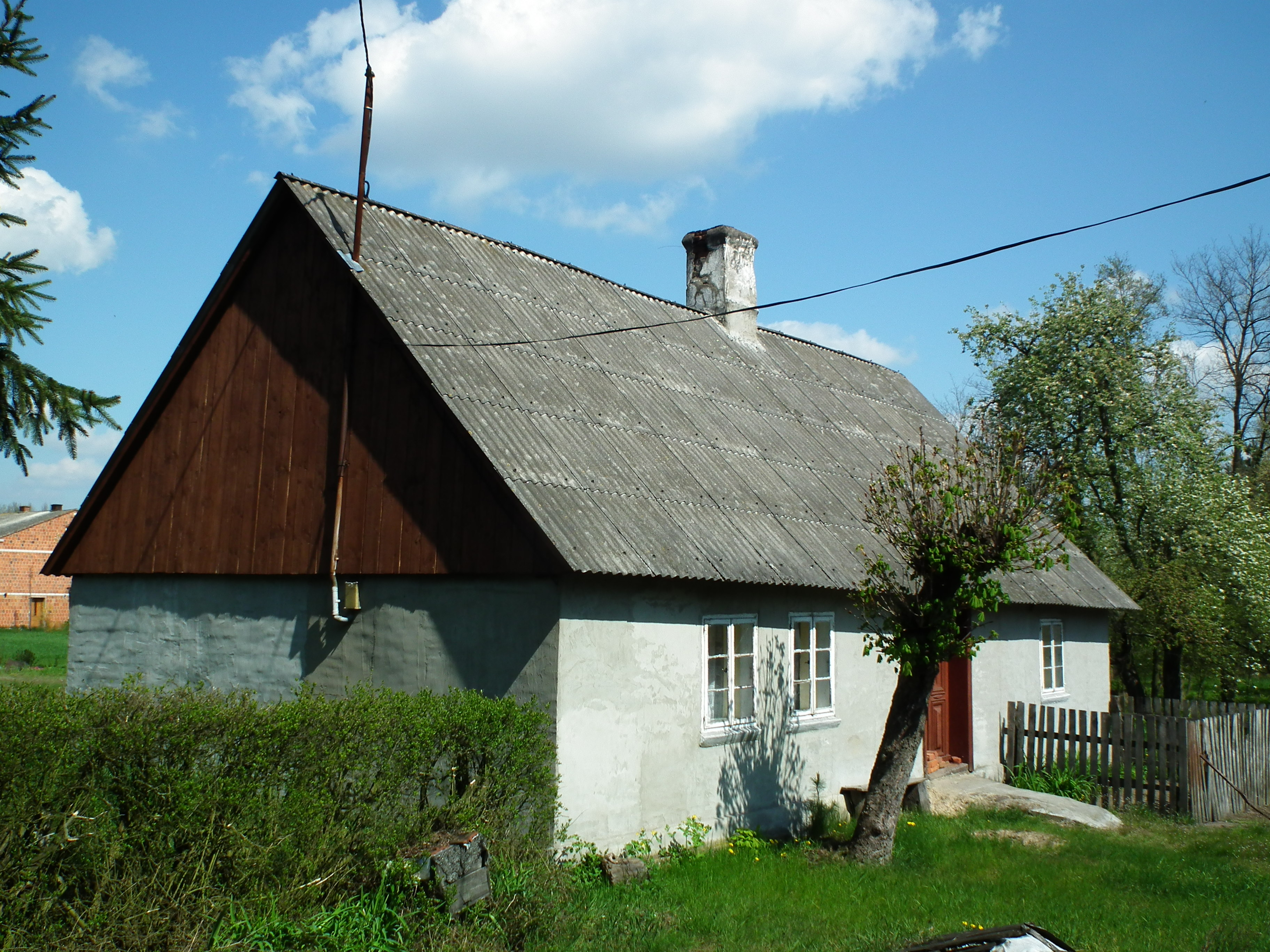

- Location within Poland
- Coordinates: 52°06′18″N 17°56′01″E
- Country: Poland
- Voivodeship: Greater Poland
- County: Słupca
- Gmina: Zagórów

Łazińsk Drugi [ˈwaʑiɲsk ˈdruɡi] is a village in the administrative district of Gmina Zagórów, within Słupca County, Greater Poland Voivodeship, in west-central Poland.
