= Drzewce, Słupca County =

Drzewce
- Village
- Location within Poland
- Coordinates: 52°9′N 17°54′E
- Country: Poland
- Voivodeship: Greater Poland
- County: Słupca
- Gmina: Zagórów

Drzewce [ˈdʐɛft͡sɛ] is a village in the administrative district of Gmina Zagórów, within Słupca County, Greater Poland Voivodeship, in west-central Poland.
