= Długa Górka =

- Village
- Location within Poland
- Coordinates: 52°09′46″N 17°51′12″E
- Country: Poland
- Voivodeship: Greater Poland
- County: Słupca
- Gmina: Zagórów
- Population: 28

Długa Górka [ˈdwuɡa ˈɡurka] is a village in the administrative district of Gmina Zagórów, within Słupca County, Greater Poland Voivodeship, in west-central Poland.
