= Michalinów (Oleśnica) =

- Village
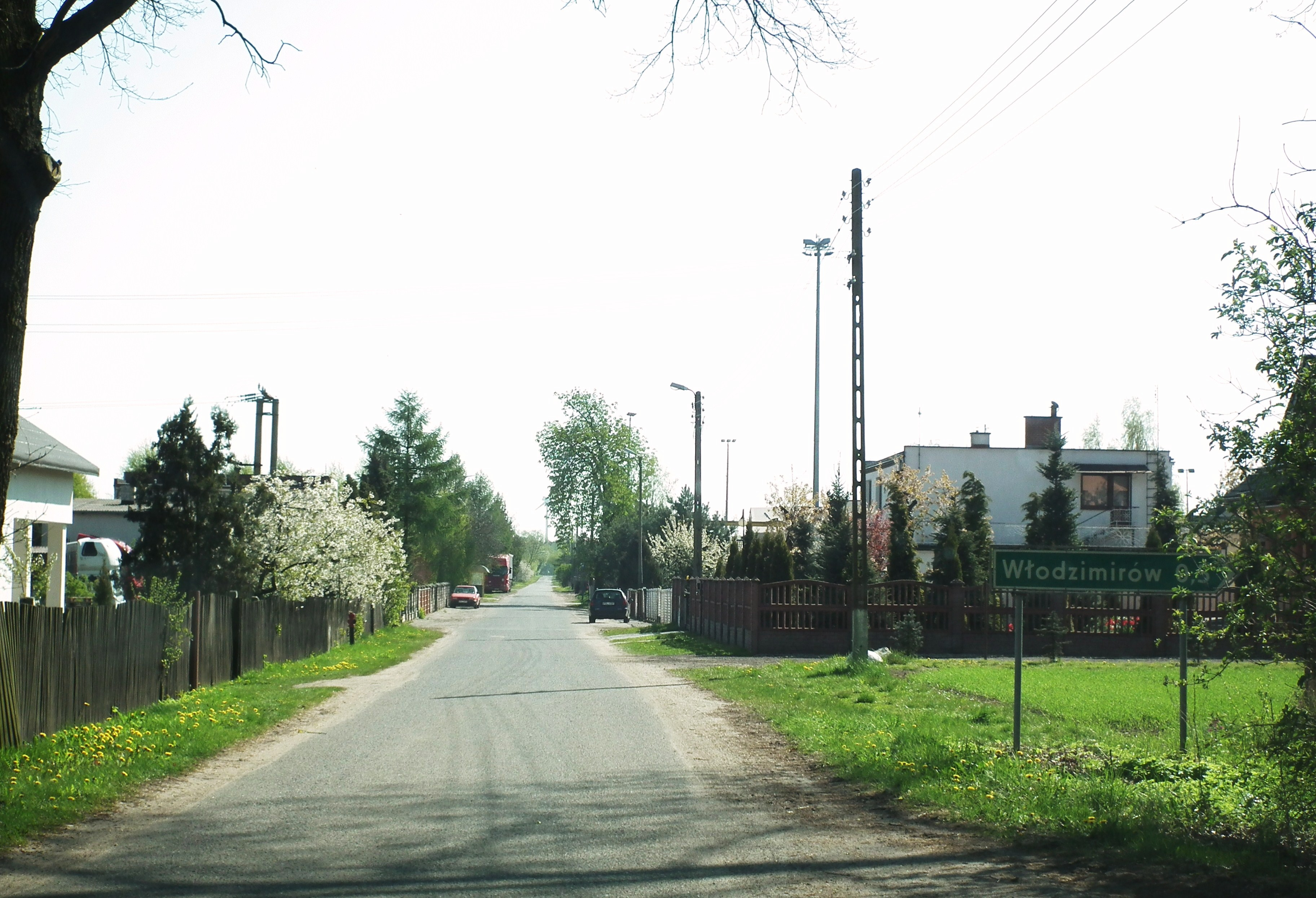

- Location within Poland
- Coordinates: 52°07′56″N 17°53′56″E
- Country: Poland
- Voivodeship: Greater Poland
- County: Słupca
- Gmina: Zagórów

Michalinów [mixaˈlinuf] near Oleśnica is a village in the administrative district of Gmina Zagórów, within Słupca County, Greater Poland Voivodeship, in west-central Poland. It is one of two villages with this name in the district, the other being Michalinów near Trąbczyn.
