= Jarosław Iwaszkiewicz =

Polish writer (1894–1980)

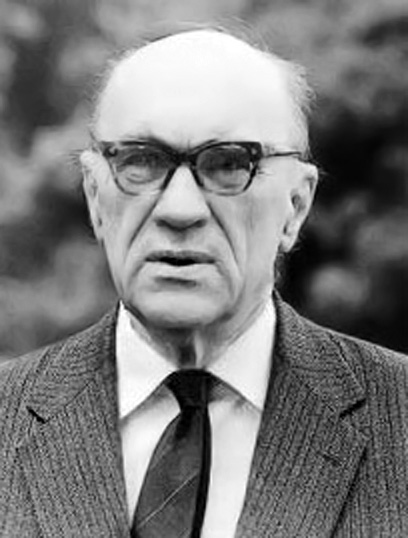
- Jarosław Iwaszkiewicz
- Born: 20 February 1894; Kalnyk, Kiev Governorate, Russian Empire
- Died: 2 March 1980 (aged 86); Warsaw, Poland
- Occupation: writer
- Writing career
- Pen name: Eleuter

Jarosław Leon Iwaszkiewicz (Polish pronunciation: [jar'ɔswav l'ɛɔn ivaʂkʲ'ɛvʲit͡ʂ] (Note: In isolation, Jarosław is pronounced [jarˈɔswaf].); also known under his literary pseudonym Eleuter; 20 February 1894 – 2 March 1980), was a Polish writer, poet, essayist, dramatist and translator. He is recognized for his literary achievements, beginning with poetry and prose written after World War I. After 1989, he was often presented as a political opportunist during his mature years lived in communist Poland, where he held high offices (participated in the criticism of Polish expatriates, literary and other figures who after World War II remained in the West). He was submitted for consideration for the Nobel Prize in Literature four times. In 1988, he was recognized as a Righteous Among the Nations for his role in sheltering Jews during World War II.

== Life and career ==
Iwaszkiewicz was born in Kalnyk in Kiev Governorate of the Russian Empire (now Vinnytsia Oblast, Ukraine). After the death of his father (an accountant), he and his mother lived in Warsaw in 1902–1904, and then moved back to Kiev Governorate. He graduated from a secondary school in Kiev in 1912 and enrolled at the Law Faculty of Kiev University.

In 1914, he travelled in Sicily and North Africa with his friend and distant cousin Karol Szymanowski, a composer for whose opera King Roger he later provided the libretto. After World War I, in October 1918 Iwaszkiewicz came to Warsaw, where he joined a group of young artists associated with the Pro Arte et Studio magazine. He had his public debut as a poet at the Pod Picadorem café on 29 November. With Julian Tuwim and Antoni Słonimski, he founded the Skamander group of experimental poets in 1919.

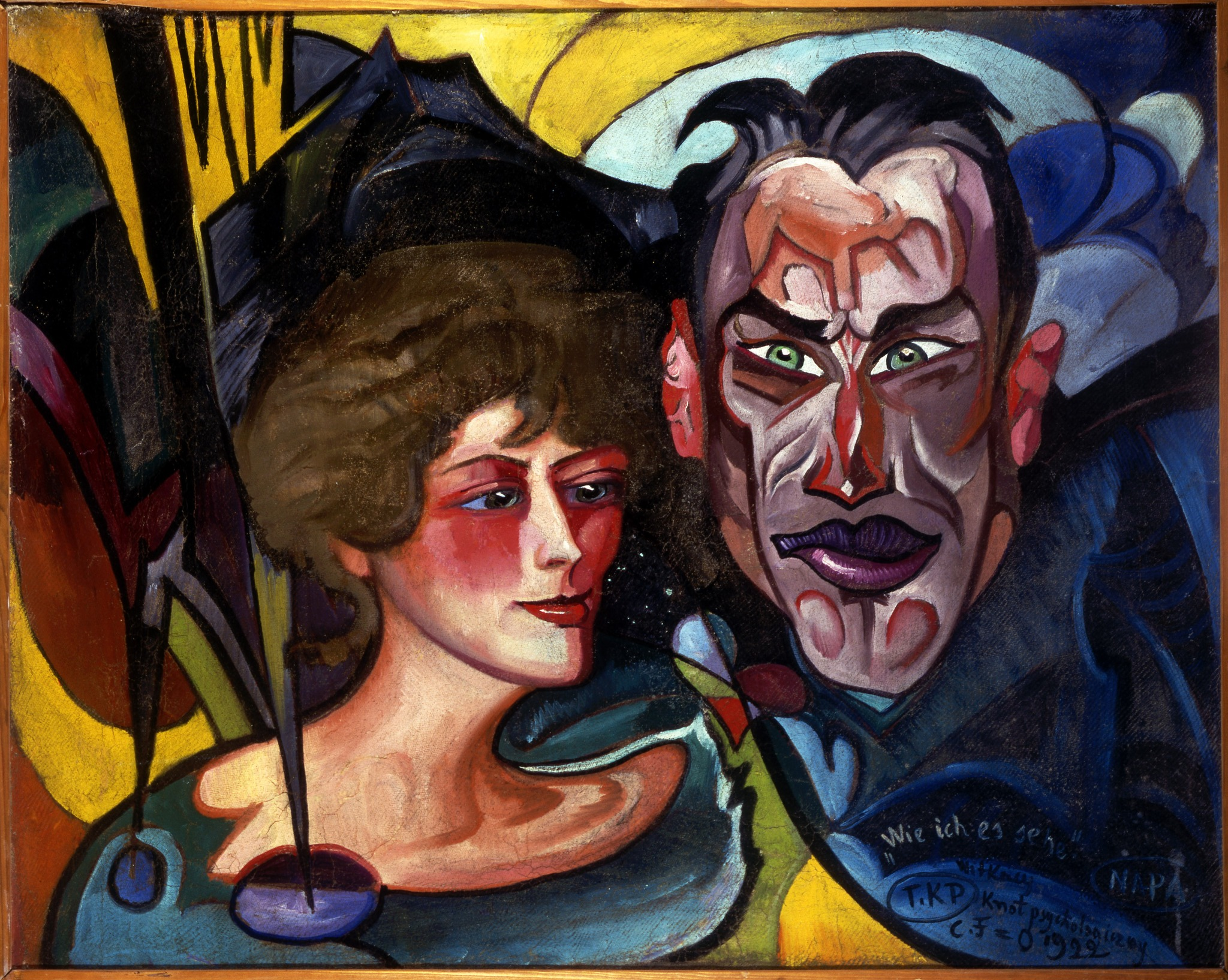
Portrait of Iwaszkiewicz and his wife Anna by Stanisław Ignacy Witkiewicz (1922)

He was appointed to be secretary of Maciej Rataj, marshal of the Sejm of the Second Polish Republic and served in that capacity in 1923–1925. Iwaszkiewicz worked for a magazine called Wiadomości Literackie ('The Literary News') in 1924–1939; he also published his works in numerous periodicals, including Gazeta Polska (1934–1938) and Ateneum (1938–1939). He was secretary to the Society for the Encouragement of Fine Arts (Towarzystwo Zachęty Sztuk Pięknych) and from 1925 a member of the Polish PEN Club. From 1927 with the Foreign Ministry, first appointed the head of the art promotion section of the Press Department and later sent as secretary of the Polish mission to Copenhagen (1932–1935) and Brussels (1935–1936). He was a member of The Trade Union of Polish Writers (Związek Zawodowy Literatów Polskich, ZZLP) and in 1939 voted its vice-president.

During World War II, Iwaszkiewicz participated in the Polish Underground State's activities, working in the Department of Education, Science and Culture of the Government Delegation for Poland. He collaborated with Prof. Stanisław Lorentz in his efforts to protect and rescue Poland's works of art. Iwaszkiewicz and his wife Anna had extensive contacts within the Jewish-Polish intelligentsia circles and assisted their former neighbors, friends and acquaintances in a variety of ways during the German occupation of Poland. Iwaszkiewicz family's Villa Stawisko residence served as a hiding place for many Jews and Poles who faced the threat of being arrested by Nazi Germans, especially after the fall of the Warsaw Uprising in 1944. At one time, more than 40 people were sheltered in the mansion. During the war, Stawisko also functioned as a center of Polish underground literature and art.

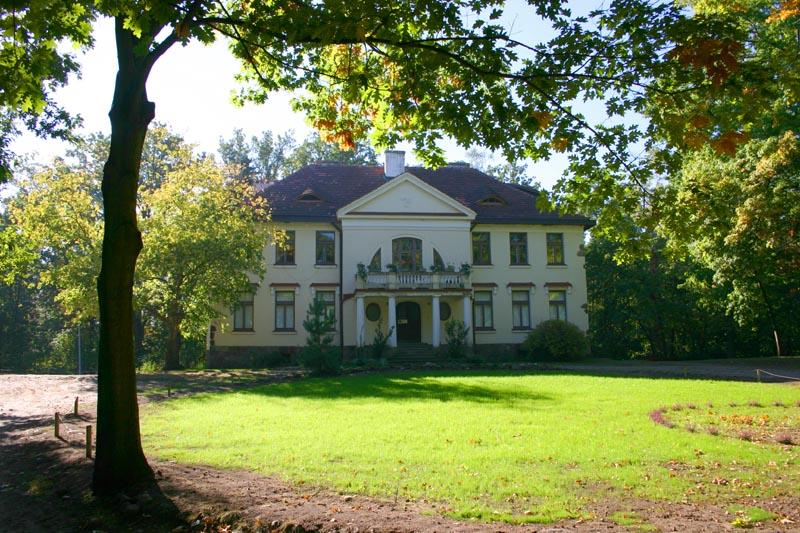
Villa Stawisko in Podkowa Leśna houses the Anna and Jarosław Iwaszkiewicz Museum.

In 1945–1946, 1947–1949 and 1959–1980, Iwaszkiewicz served as head of the Polish Writers' Union. In 1945–1949 and 1955–1957 he was literary manager of the Polish Theatre in Warsaw. From March 1947 to December 1949, he published the Nowiny literackie ('Literary News') magazine. Beginning in 1956, for many years he was chief editor of the monthly Twórczość ('Creativity'). Vice-president of the Polish PEN Club in 1950–1965.

Iwaszkiewicz was an organizer of the World Congress of Intellectuals in Defense of Peace held in Wrocław in 1948 and a delegate to the World Peace Congress in 1950.

He served as a nonpartisan member of parliament from 1952 until his death in 1980. In his last three terms, he was the Senior Marshal of the Sejm. Iwaszkiewicz wrote of his deeply socialist convictions, but was ambivalent and privately bitter about the political reality of the Polish People's Republic, within which he officially functioned. Nevertheless, he was greatly impressed by the appreciation note that he received from Bolesław Bierut on the 40th anniversary of Iwaszkiewicz's literary career. In 1956, he was thrilled by the Polish October events. After a conversation with Edward Ochab in 1961, Iwaszkiewicz wrote: "They blame me for not having done anything as a member of the Sejm, but then they want me to be a deputy again". He continued his lifelong habit of making many foreign trips.

Iwaszkiewicz wrote novels and short stories, poems, dramatic works, essays and columns, and translations from French, English, Russian and Danish literatures. His major epic novel is Sława i Chwała ('Fame and Glory') – a panorama of life of Polish intelligentsia in the first half of the 20th century. In particular, he is highly regarded for his short stories, a genre he developed and modernized. Using changing forms and themes, throughout his career Iwaszkiewicz produced collections of poems of major significance. He wrote plays based on classical motifs and many miscellaneous pieces reflecting his interests and pursuits in areas such as music and theatre, travel, and popularization of culture.

In 1936, Iwaszkiewicz won the Golden Laurel (Polish: Złoty Wawrzyn) conferred by the Polish Academy of Literature. He was twice awarded the Order of Merit of the Republic of Poland (1946 and 1947) and also the Order of the Builders of People's Poland in 1954. In 1955, he became the recipient of the Order of Merit of the Italian Republic and the Medal of the 10th Anniversary of People's Poland. In 1970, he was awarded the Lenin Peace Prize. In 1974, Edward Gierek awarded him with the Grand Cross of the Order of Polonia Restituta. He received honorary doctorates from the University of Warsaw in 1971 and the Jagiellonian University in 1979, as well as numerous other Polish, foreign and international awards and distinctions. However, Iwaszkiewicz's works were removed in Poland from school recommended readings after the collapse of the Soviet Bloc. They have since been regaining the recognition of their value and rank.

Czesław Miłosz wrote the following: "Iwaszkiewicz is a great figure and nobody who deals with Polish literature can omit him. Even if some parts of his huge literary output are excluded, there is enough left, also as a testimony to the three epochs, to secure for him a place higher than that of any of his contemporaries". He concluded, "One is almost inclined to believe that some people are gripped by circumstances meant for them, and that for him the good fortunes, after his impoverished youth, began in the interwar period, to endure also later". For Miłosz could not imagine Iwaszkiewicz as an émigré personality.

Iwaszkiewicz died on 2 March 1980 and was buried on 5 March at the cemetery in Brwinów near Warsaw, according to his last wish in a miner's uniform.

== Personal life ==
In 1922, Iwaszkiewicz married Anna Lilpop (1897–1979), a writer and translator and daughter of Stanisław Wilhelm Lilpop, a wealthy entrepreneur. The couple settled in Podkowa Leśna near Warsaw. In 1928, they moved to a newly built villa that Iwaszkiewicz named Stawisko. It currently houses a museum devoted to Iwaszkiewicz and his wife. They had two daughters: Maria (1924–2019) and Teresa (1928–2012). Iwaszkiewicz was bisexual and homoerotic; those themes are present in his poetry and prose works. In his diaries he describes himself as a "homosexual"; however, in light of the current understanding of human sexual orientation and his biography, he can be characterized as a bisexual. Iwaszkiewicz experienced and described a particularly intense relationship with a younger man terminally ill with tuberculosis; it commenced when the writer was over sixty years old. His wife always "knew of all of his affections".

In 2012, his great-granddaughter Ludwika Włodek wrote a best-selling biographical book about the life of her great-grandfather, titled Pra.

== Works ==
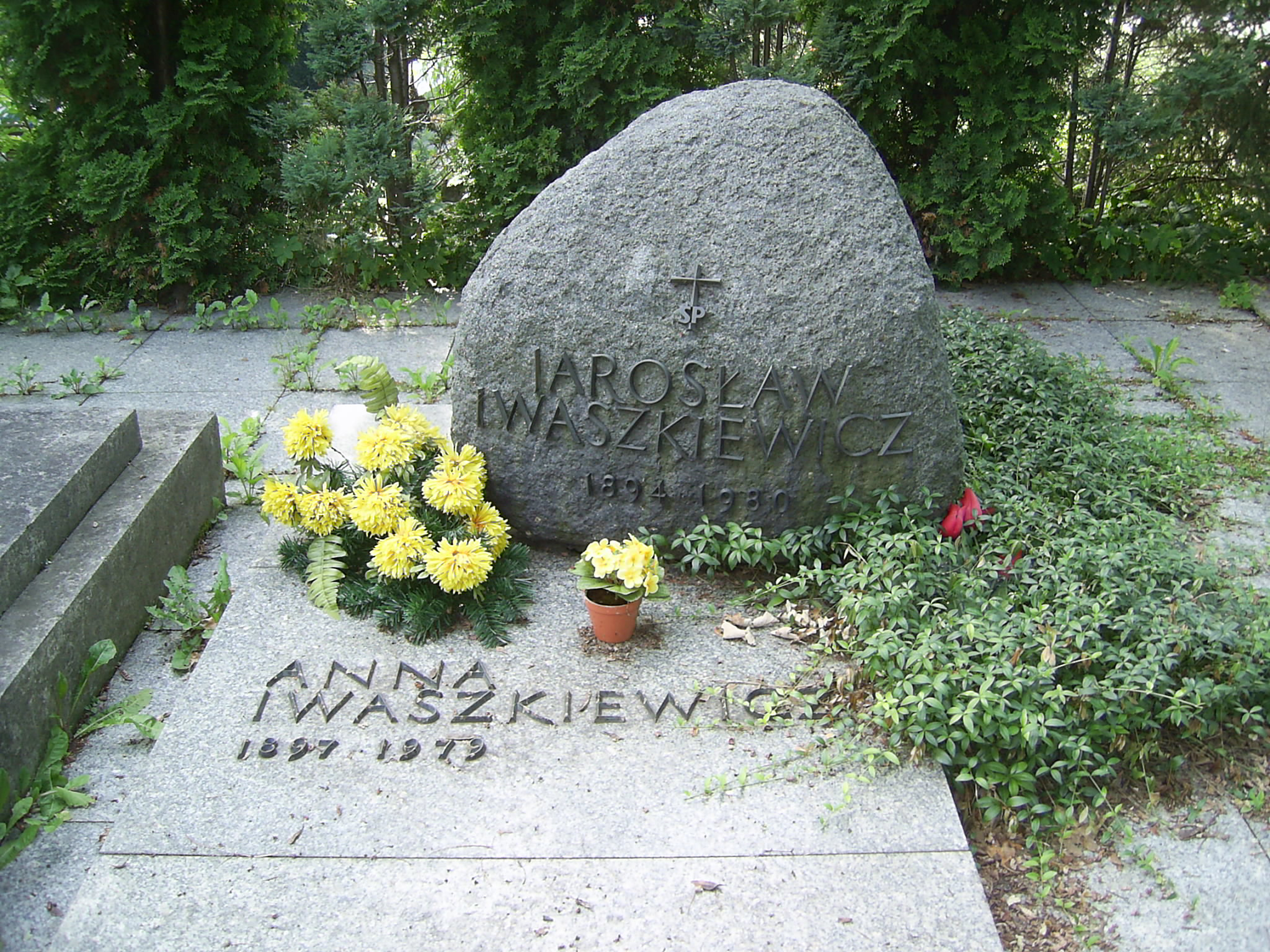
Grave of Jarosław and Anna Iwaszkiewicz in Brwinów

=== Short stories ===
- Panny z Wilka ('The Wilko Girls'); Brzezina ('The Birch Grove'), Warsaw 1933
- Młyn nad Utratą ('The Mill on the River Utrata'), Warsaw 1936
- Dwa opowiadania ('Two Stories'), Warsaw 1938
- Nowa miłość i inne opowiadania ('New Love and Other Stories'), Warsaw 1946
- Tatarak i inne opowiadania ('Calamus and Other Stories'), Warsaw 1960
- Heidenreich. Cienie. Dwa opowiadania ('Heidenreich. Shadows. Two Stories'), Poznań 1964

=== Novels ===
- Zenobia Palmura, Poznań 1920
- Ucieczka do Bagdadu ('Escape to Baghdad'), Warsaw 1923
- Hilary, syn buchaltera ('Hilary, Son of a Bookkeeper'), Warsaw 1923
- Księżyc wschodzi ('The Moon Rises'), Warsaw 1925
- Zmowa mężczyzn ('Conspiracy of Men'), Warsaw 1930
- Czerwone tarcze ('Red Shields'), Warsaw 1934
- Sława i chwała ('Fame and Glory'), vol. 1–3, Warsaw 1956–1962

=== Poetry ===
- Oktostychy ('Octostichs'), Warsaw 1919
- Dionizje ('Dionysiacs'), Warsaw 1922
- Kaskady zakończone siedmioma wierszami ('Cascades Ending in Seven Poems'), Warsaw 1925
- Pejzaże sentymentalne ('Sentimental Landscapes'), Warsaw 1926
- Ksiega dnia i księga nocy ('The Book of Day and the Book of Night'), Warsaw 1929
- Powrót do Europy ('Return to Europe'), Warsaw 1931
- Lato 1932 ('Summer 1932'), 1933
- Inne życie ('Another Life'), 1938
- Ody olimpijskie ('Olympian Odes'), Warsaw 1948
- Warkocz jesieni ('The Plait of Autumn'), Warsaw 1954
- Ciemne ścieżki ('Dark Paths'), Warsaw 1957
- Jutro żniwa ('Harvest Tomorrow'), Warsaw 1963
- Krągły rok ('Year Round'), Warsaw 1967
- Xenie i elegie ('Xenias and Elegies'), Warsaw 1970
- Śpiewnik włoski ('Italian Songbook'), Warsaw 1974
- Mapa pogody ('Weather Map'), Warsaw 1977

=== Plays ===
- Libretto to Karol Szymanowski's King Roger; premiere in Teatr Wielki, Warsaw 1926. Szymanowski completely re-wrote the third act libretto.
- Kochankowie z Werony. Tragedia romatyczna w 3 aktach ('The Lovers of Verona. Romantic Tragedy in 3 Acts'); premiere in Teatr Nowy, Warsaw 1930
- Lato w Nohant. Komedia w 3 aktach ('The Summer at Nohant. Comedy in 3 Acts'); premiere in Teatr Mały, Warsaw 1936
- Maskarada. Melodramat w 4 Aktach ('Masquerade. Melodrama in 4 Acts'); premiere in Teatr Polski, Warsaw 1938
- Odbudowa Błędomierza. Sztuka w 3 aktach ('The Rebuilding of Błędomierz. Play in 3 Acts'); premiere in Teatr Stary, Kraków 1951
- Wesele Pana Balzaka ('The Wedding of Mr. Balzac'); premiere in Teatr Kameralny, Warsaw 1959
- Kosmogonia ('Cosmogony'); premiere in Teatr Polski, Warsaw 1967

(Lato w Nohant is based on an episode in Frédéric Chopin's life and Maskarada on Alexander Pushkin's final days.)

== Adaptations ==
=== Films ===
- Matka Joanna od aniołów ('Mother Joan of the Angels') by Jerzy Kawalerowicz 1961
- Kochankowie z Marony ('The Lovers of Marona') by Jerzy Zarzycki 1966
- Brzezina ('The Birch Grove' ) by Andrzej Wajda 1970
- Panny z Wilka ('The Wilko Girls') by Andrzej Wajda 1979
- Ryś (('The Lynx'), based on Iwaszkiewicz's short story Kościół w Skaryszewie ('The Church in Skaryszew')) by Stanisław Różewicz 1981
- Kochankowie z Marony ('The Lovers of Marona') by Izabela Cywińska 2005
- Tatarak ('Calamus') by Andrzej Wajda 2009

== Awards and decorations ==
- Order of the Builders of People's Poland Order of the Builders of People's Poland
- Grand Cross of Order of Polonia Restituta (1974)
- Order of the Banner of Labour, 1st Class (22 July 1949)
- Commander's Cross with Star of Order of Polonia Restituta (13 February 1954)
- Golden Cross of Merit (twice on 15 June 1946 and 17 September 1946)
- Golden Academic Laurel (7 November 1936)
- Medal of the 30th Anniversary of People's Poland (1974)
- Medal of the 10th Anniversary of People's Poland (19 January 1955)
- Bronze Medal of Merit for National Defence (1967)
- Badge of the 1000th Anniversary of the Polish State (1963)
- Grand Officer of Order of Merit of the Italian Republic (Italy, 1965)
- Order of the National Flag, 1st Class (North Korea, 1954)
- Order of Friendship of Peoples (USSR, 1974)

== See also ==
- Polish literature
