= Mariantów, Słupca County =

Mariantów
- Village
- Location within Poland
- Coordinates: 52°07′50″N 17°58′07″E
- Country: Poland
- Voivodeship: Greater Poland
- County: Słupca
- Gmina: Zagórów

Mariantów [maˈrjantuf] is a village in the administrative district of Gmina Zagórów, within Słupca County, Greater Poland Voivodeship, in west-central Poland. As of the 2021 census, the village had a population of 71 residents.
