= Oleśnica-Folwark =

- Village
- Location within Poland
- Coordinates: 52°09′29″N 17°56′03″E
- Country: Poland
- Voivodeship: Greater Poland
- County: Słupca
- Gmina: Zagórów
- Population: 88

Oleśnica-Folwark (Polish pronunciation: [ɔlɛˈɕɲit͡sa ˈfɔlvark]) is a village in the administrative district of Gmina Zagórów, within Słupca County, Greater Poland Voivodeship, in west-central Poland.
