= Nowa Wieś, Gmina Zagórów =

Nowa Wieś
- Village
- Location within Poland
- Coordinates: 52°8′33″N 17°56′15″E
- Country: Poland
- Voivodeship: Greater Poland
- County: Słupca
- Gmina: Zagórów
- Population: 160

Nowa Wieś [ˈnɔva ˈvjɛɕ] is a village in the administrative district of Gmina Zagórów, within Słupca County, Greater Poland Voivodeship, in west-central Poland.
