= Kopojno-Parcele =

- Village
- Location within Poland
- Coordinates: 52°09′55″N 17°58′46″E
- Country: Poland
- Voivodeship: Greater Poland
- County: Słupca
- Gmina: Zagórów
- Population: 148

Kopojno-Parcele [kɔˈpɔi̯nɔ parˈt͡sɛlɛ] is a village in the administrative district of Gmina Zagórów, within Słupca County, Greater Poland Voivodeship, in west-central Poland.
