= Michalinów (Trąbczyn) =

- Village
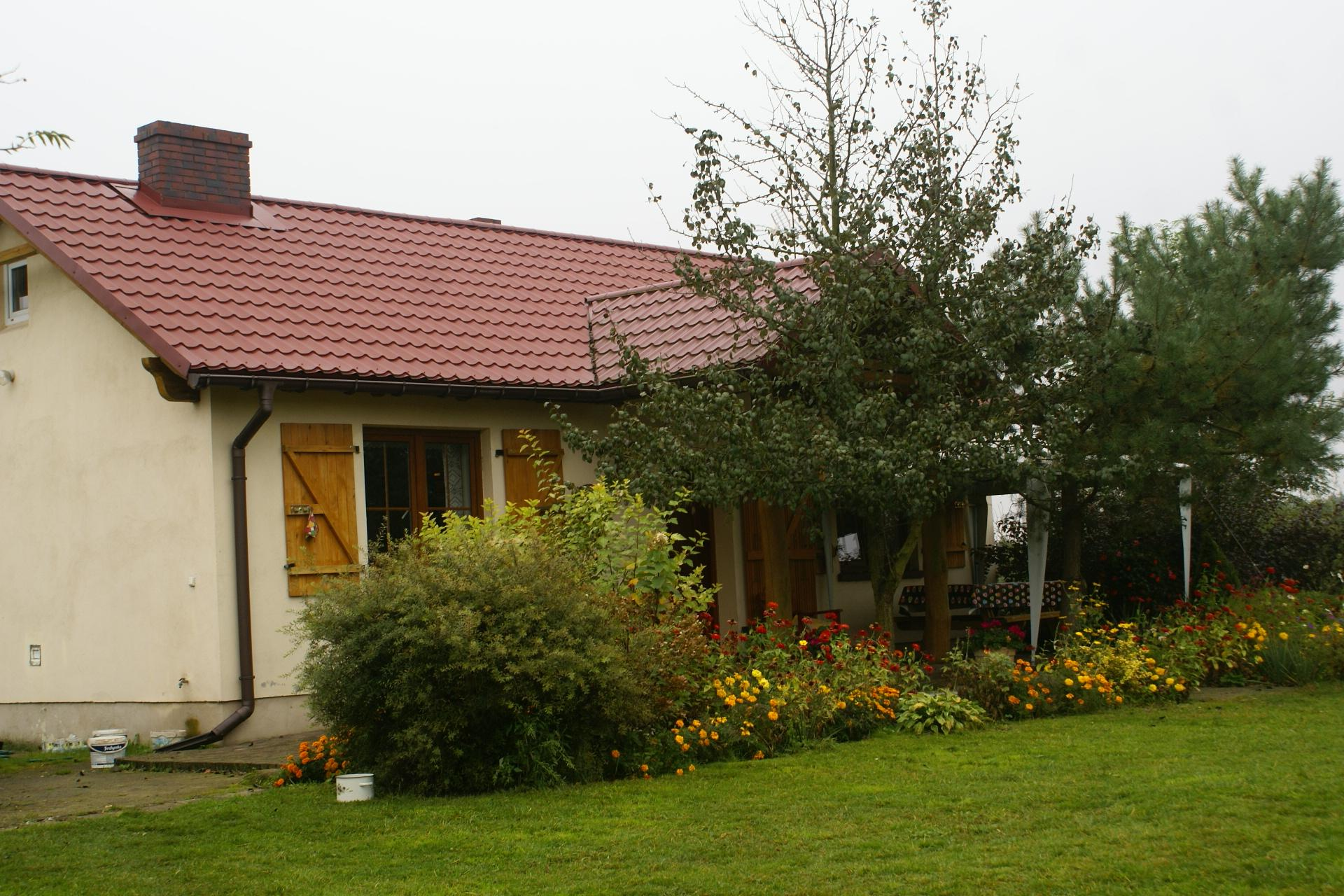
- House in Michalinów

- Location within Poland
- Coordinates: 52°07′08″N 17°56′17″E
- Country: Poland
- Voivodeship: Greater Poland
- County: Słupca
- Gmina: Zagórów

Michalinów [mixaˈlinuf] near Trąbczyn is a village in the administrative district of Gmina Zagórów, within Słupca County, Greater Poland Voivodeship, in west-central Poland. It is one of two villages with this name in the district, the other being Michalinów near Oleśnica.
