= Kazimierz Kostanecki =

Polish physician, anatomist and cytologist

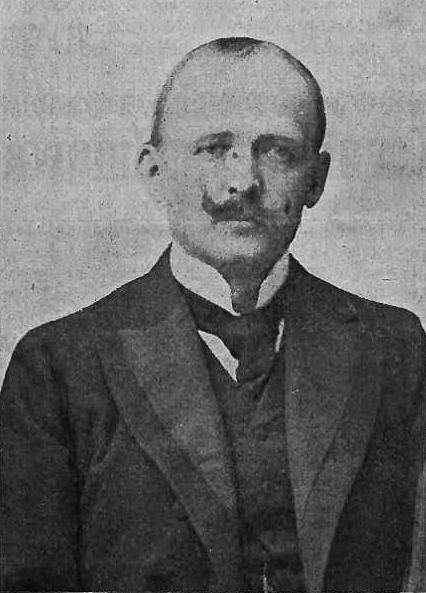
Kazimierz Kostanecki (1907)

Professor Kazimierz Kostanecki (25 December 1863, Myszaków – 11 January 1940, Sachsenhausen concentration camp) was a Polish physician, anatomist, and cytologist. Since 1892 he had been a professor of comparative and descriptive anatomy at the Jagiellonian University in Kraków under the military partitions of Poland. He held his post until 1935 in the reborn Second Polish Republic. During this time he also served as Dean of the Faculty of Medicine, and between 1913 and 1916 was the Rector of the Jagiellonian University. He is considered the father of the Kraków school of anatomy due to his many scientific discoveries and accomplishments.

Kostanecki is the author of 62 scientific publications in Polish, English, German, and French. During his work in Berlin and Giessen he conducted research in the field of comparative anatomy of throat and palate, and the anatomy of the neck and head. He also described all the muscles associated with the Ear trumpet and, as the first, described their inner connections. In Kraków, he conducted pioneering research into the process of maturation of oocytes. In the final period of his scientific work he studied the phylogenetic development of the cecum and the appendix, and the functioning of the lymphoid tissue. Kostanecki was the recipient of many prestigious awards.

After the invasion of Poland by Nazi Germany and the Soviet Union in 1939, Kostanecki was arrested on 6 November 1939 in his Alma mater during the German Sonderaktion Krakau against the Polish professors and academics. He died in the Sachsenhausen concentration camp on 11 January 1940.

== Honours and awards ==
=== Foreign honours ===
- Austria-Hungary: Grand Gross of the Order of Franz Joseph (1916)
- Czechoslovakia: Grand Officer of the Order of the White Lion (1933)
