= Kirchol =

- Settlement
- Location within Poland
- Coordinates: 52°09′12″N 17°52′01″E
- Country: Poland
- Voivodeship: Greater Poland
- County: Słupca
- Gmina: Zagórów
- Population: 4

Kirchol [ˈkirxɔl] is a settlement in the administrative district of Gmina Zagórów, within Słupca County, Greater Poland Voivodeship, in west-central Poland.
