= Wrąbczyn =

- Village
- Location within Poland
- Coordinates: 52°10′N 17°51′E
- Country: Poland
- Voivodeship: Greater Poland
- County: Słupca
- Gmina: Zagórów

Wrąbczyn [ˈvrɔmpt͡ʂɨn] is a village in the administrative district of Gmina Zagórów, within Słupca County, Greater Poland Voivodeship, in west-central Poland.
