= Olchowo, Greater Poland Voivodeship =

Olchowo
- Village
- Location within Poland
- Coordinates: 52°11′N 17°57′E
- Country: Poland
- Voivodeship: Greater Poland
- County: Słupca
- Gmina: Zagórów

Olchowo [ɔlˈxɔvɔ] is a village in the administrative district of Gmina Zagórów, within Słupca County, Greater Poland Voivodeship, in west-central Poland.
