= Stawisko, Greater Poland Voivodeship =

Stawisko
- Village
- Location within Poland
- Coordinates: 52°06′31″N 17°52′10″E
- Country: Poland
- Voivodeship: Greater Poland
- County: Słupca
- Gmina: Zagórów
- Population: 34

Stawisko [staˈviskɔ] is a village in the administrative district of Gmina Zagórów, Słupca County in the Greater Poland Voivodeship of west-central Poland.
