= Huta Łukomska =

- Village
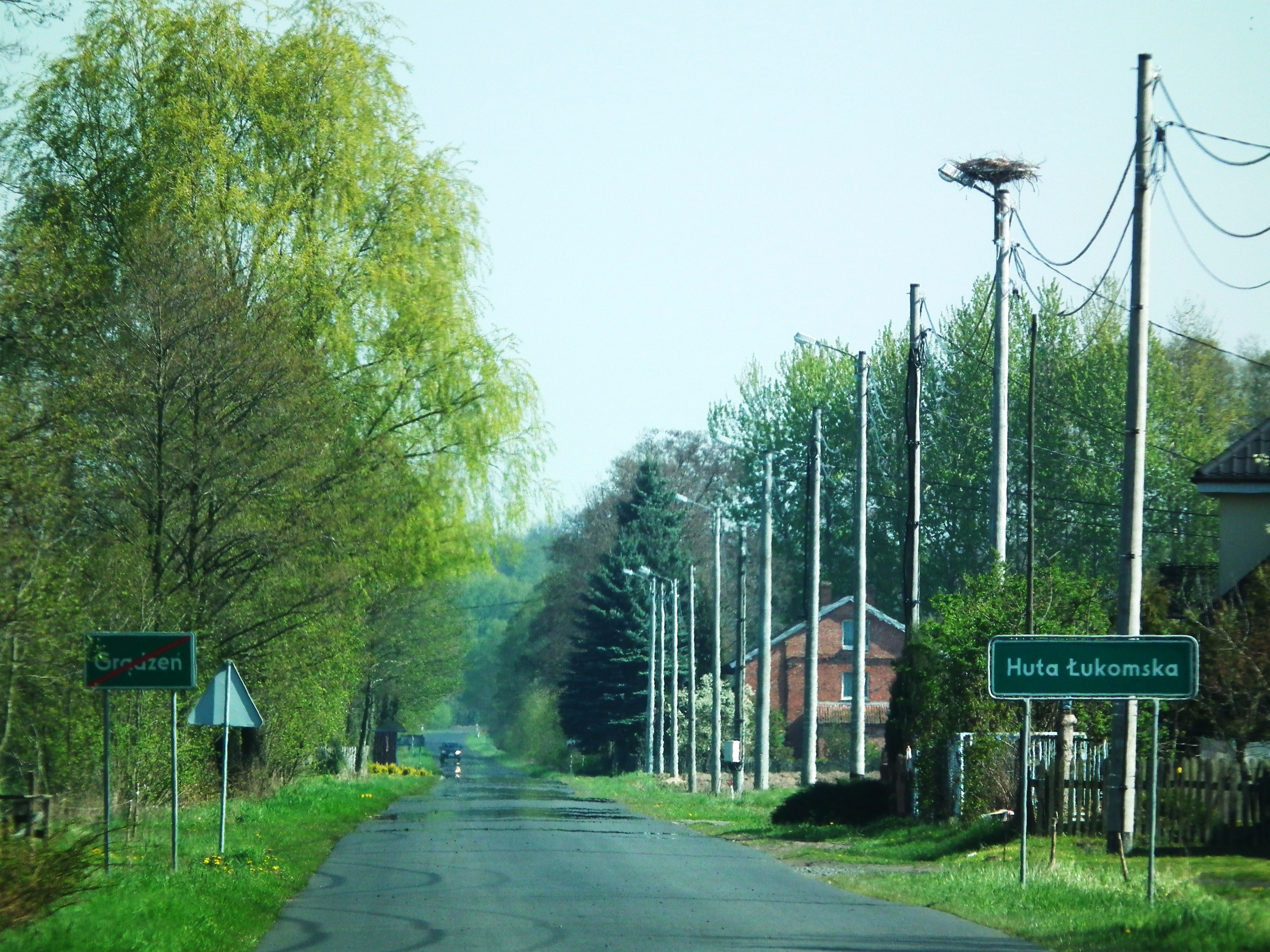
- Entrance to Huta Łukomska

- Location within Poland
- Coordinates: 52°6′35″N 17°49′50″E
- Country: Poland
- Voivodeship: Greater Poland
- County: Słupca
- Gmina: Zagórów
- Population: 77

Huta Łukomska [ˈxuta wuˈkɔmska] is a village in the administrative district of Gmina Zagórów, within Słupca County, Greater Poland Voivodeship, in west-central Poland.
