= Myszaków =

- Village
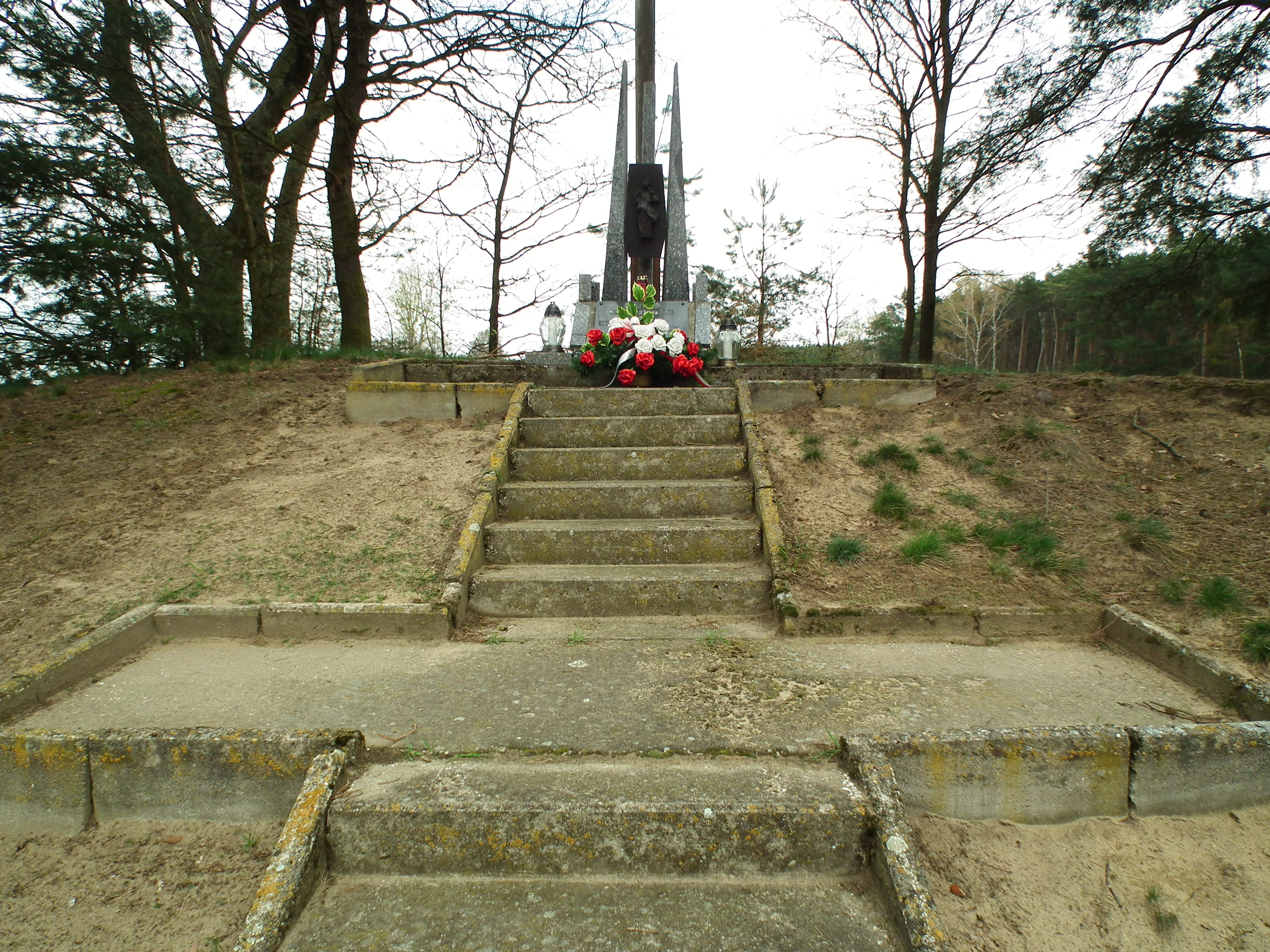
- Grave of Polish insurgents from 1863

- Location within Poland
- Coordinates: 52°8′22″N 17°48′2″E
- Country: Poland
- Voivodeship: Greater Poland
- County: Słupca
- Gmina: Zagórów
- Population: 150
- Time zone: UTC+1 (CET)
  - Summer (DST): UTC+2 (CEST)

Myszaków [mɨˈʂakuf] is a village in the administrative district of Gmina Zagórów, within Słupca County, Greater Poland Voivodeship, in west-central Poland.

One of the battles of the Polish January Uprising against the Russian Empire was fought near the village in 1863. There is a mass grave of the Polish insurgents in the village.

== Notable people ==
- Stanisław Kostanecki (1860–1910), one of the most renown Polish organic chemists
- Kazimierz Kostanecki (1863–1940), Polish physician, anatomist, cytologist, murdered by the Germans in the Sachsenhausen concentration camp
- Antoni Kostanecki (1866–1941), Polish economist, rector of the University of Warsaw
