= Podbiel, Greater Poland Voivodeship =

Podbiel
- Village
- Location within Poland
- Coordinates: 52°8′22″N 17°48′2″E
- Country: Poland
- Voivodeship: Greater Poland
- County: Słupca
- Gmina: Zagórów
- Population: 150

Podbiel [ˈpɔdbjɛl] is a village in the administrative district of Gmina Zagórów, within Słupca County, Greater Poland Voivodeship, in west-central Poland.
