= List of special reconnaissance units =

The following list of organizations possess the capability to conduct special reconnaissance (SR) and other special operations roles, with SR often by specialists within them. Certain organizations are tasked for response involving areas contaminated by chemicals, biological agents, or radioactivity.

== Current ==
=== Albania ===
- Special Operations Battalion (Albania) (BOS)

=== Algeria ===
- Groupe d'Intervention Spécial (GIS)

=== Australia ===
- Special Air Service Regiment (SASR)
- 2nd Commando Regiment (2CDO)

=== Brazil ===
- Special Operations Command (Comando de Operações Especiais)
- Marine Special Operations Battalion (Batalhão de Operações Especiais de Fuzileiros Navais, Batalhão Tonelero)

=== Bulgaria ===
- 68th Special Forces Brigade

=== Canada ===
- Joint Task Force 2 (JTF2), the Canadian Forces’ special operations and counter-terrorism unit
- Canadian Special Operations Regiment (CSOR)

=== China ===
- People's Liberation Army Special Operations Forces
  - Guangzhou Military Region Special Forces Unit - Established in 1988 as the PLA’s first special reconnaissance group, and was later expanded in 2000 to become the first PLA special operations unit to be capable of air, sea, and land operations.
  - Chengdu Military Region Special Forces Unit – Nickname “Falcon”. Established in 1992, this unit is specialised in target locating and indicating, airborne insertion, sabotage and offensive strike, and emergency evacuation. The unit was also used by Chengdu MR to experiment with various new concept equipment and tactics, including the digitised army soldier system and high-mobility land weapon platforms.
  - Beijing Military Region Special Forces Unit - Established in the early 1990s, this unit is equipped with various “high-tech” equipment including unmanned aerial reconnaissance vehicle (UARV), individual explosion device, handheld laser dazzling weapon, etc.
  - Shenyang Military Region Special Forces Unit
  - Nanjing Military Region Special Forces Unit - Nickname “Flying Dragon”
  - Nanjing Military Region Special Forces Unit - Nickname “Eagle”
  - Lanzhou Military Region Special Forces Unit

=== Czech Republic ===
- 102nd Reconnaissance Battalion of General Karel Palecek
- 601st Special Forces Group

=== Denmark ===
- Jægerkorpset (Danish Army)
- Frømandskorpset (Royal Danish Navy)
- Special Support and Reconnaissance Company (Danish Home Guard)

=== Finland ===
- Special Operations Detachment (SOD)

=== France ===
- 1st Marine Infantry Parachute Regiment (1er RPIMa)
- 3rd Marine Infantry Parachute Regiment (3e RPIMa)
- 2nd Foreign Parachute Regiment (2e REP)
- 13th Parachute Dragoon Regiment (13e RDP)
- Air Parachute Commando No. 10 (CPA 10)
- Commando de Montfort
- Commando de Penfentenyo

=== India ===
- Special Frontier Force
- MARCOS
- Para Commandos (India)
- Garud Commando Force

=== Indonesia ===
- Kopassus
- Combat Reconnaissance Platoon (Ton Taipur)
- Taifib
- Kopaska

=== Ireland ===
- Army Ranger Wing (ARW)
- Directorate of Military Intelligence

=== Israel ===
- Alpinist Unit
- Maglan
- Sayeret Matkal
- Shayetet 13
- Shaldag Unit
- Yahalom

=== Italy ===
- 4th Alpini Paratroopers Regiment (4th APR)
- 17th Raiders Wing (17th RW)
- 185th Paratroopers Reconnaissance Target Acquisition Regiment "Folgore"
- COMSUBIN

=== Netherlands ===
- 11 Brigade Recconnaissance Squadron
- Korps Commandotroepen (KCT)
- MARSOF

=== New Zealand ===
- New Zealand Special Air Service (NZSAS)

=== Norway ===
- Forsvarets Spesialkommando (FSK)
- Kystjegerkommandoen (KJK)
- Marinejegerkommandoen (MJK)
- Intelligence regiment

=== Philippines ===
- Light Reaction Regiment
- Special Operations Command
- 1st Scout Ranger Regiment
- Naval Special Operations Command
- Force Reconnaissance Group
- Special Forces Regiment (Philippines)

=== Poland ===
- Jednostka Wojskowa Grom
- Jednostka Wojskowa Komandosów
- Jednostka Wojskowa Formoza
- Jednostka Wojskowa Agat
- Jednostka Wojskowa Nil

=== Portugal ===
- Air-Land Pathfinders Company (Precs)
- Destacamento de Ações Especiais (DAE)
- Special Operations Troops Centre (CTOE)

=== Russia ===
- Spetsnaz
- Federal Security Service "FSB"
  - Alpha Group Directorate "A" of the FSB Special Purpose Center (TsSN FSB) is an elite, stand-alone sub-unit of Russia's special forces.
  - Vympel Group Directorate "B" Vympel Group is an elite Russian spetsnaz unit under the command of the FSB. (TsSN FSB)
- Armed Forces of the Russian Federation
  - Spetsnaz GRU 2nd, 3rd, 10th, 14th, 16th, 24th, and 25th Spetsnaz Brigade (obrSpN)
  - 45th Detached Reconnaissance Regiment Spetsnaz VDV (orpSpN)
  - Russian commando frogmen 42nd, 420th, 431st, and 561st Naval Reconnaissance Spetsnaz Point (omrpSpN)
  - Voennaya Razvedka "Military intelligence" personnel/units within larger formations in ground troops, airborne troops and marines. Intelligence battalion in the divisions, reconnaissance company in the brigade, a reconnaissance platoon in the regiment. The same level of training as Spetsnaz GRU but not controlled by the GRU. A bat is their mascot.

=== Sri Lanka ===
- Commando Regiment (CR)
- Long Range Reconnaissance Patrol (LRRP)
- Regiment Special Force (RSF)
- Special Boat Squadron (SBS)
- Special Forces Regiment (SF)

=== Sweden ===
- Fallskärmsjägarna
- Flygbasjägarna
- Kustjägarna
- Särskilda operationsgruppen

=== Thailand ===
- Long-Range Reconnaissance Patrol Company
- RTMC Reconnaissance Battalion
- RTN SEALs
- Special Operations Regiment

=== Ukraine ===
- 3rd Separate Special Forces Regiment
- 140th Separate Reconnaissance Battalion

=== United Kingdom ===
- Special Air Service
- Special Boat Service
- Special Reconnaissance Regiment
- Pathfinder Platoon of 16 Air Assault Brigade
- Brigade Reconnaissance Force, 3 Commando Brigade
- 148 (Meiktila) Battery Royal Artillery

=== United States ===
- 75th Ranger Regiment
  - 75th Ranger Regiment, Regimental Reconnaissance Company (RRC)
- United States Army Special Forces (Green Berets)
- United States Army SOT-A (Special Operations Team-Alpha)
- 1st Special Forces Operational Detachment-Delta (Delta Force or Combat Applications Group)
- Intelligence Support Activity
- United States Navy SEALs
- United States Naval Special Warfare Development Group (DEVGRU)
- Air Force Special Tactics Combat Controllers
- Air Force Special Reconnaissance (SR)
- Marine Raiders

== Historical ==
=== Nazi Germany ===
- Brandenburger Regiment

=== United Kingdom ===
- Special Operations Executive more a direct action organization, but conducted some reconnaissance. Espionage was under the continuing Secret Intelligence Service
- 14 Field Security and Intelligence Company "The Det"

=== United States ===
- Office of Strategic Services

- 2671st Special Reconnaissance Battalion

=== Australia ===
- Services Reconnaissance Department
- Combined Field Intelligence Service (Coastwatchers)
- Allied Intelligence Bureau

== See also ==
- List of military special forces units
- List of commando units
