= Georgian Special Operations Command =

- სპეციალური ოპერაციების სარდლობა
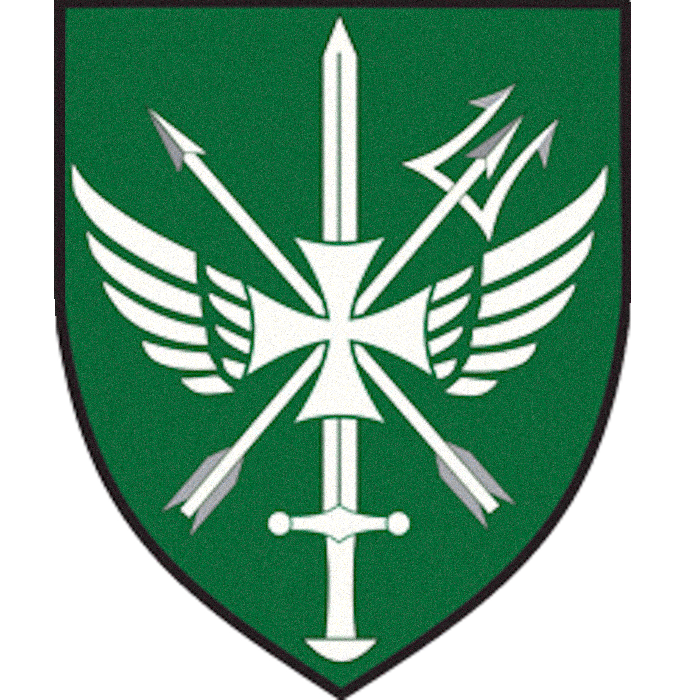
- GSOC insignia
- Active: 22 November 1999 – present
- Country: Georgia
- Type: Special operations forces
- Role: Special operations Special reconnaissance Unconventional warfare Direct action HVT raids Counter-terrorism / insurgency psychological warfare
- Part of: Georgian Defence Forces
- Garrison/HQ: Tbilisi
- Nickname: "the vicious"
- Color of Beret: Rifle green
- Engagements: 1991: Georgian Civil War*; 1992: War in Abkhazia*: Battle of Gagra; 1999–2003: Kosovo Force; 2001 Macedonia insurgency (border); Since 2001: War on terror 2002–2003 Pankisi Gorge crisis 2003 Rose Revolution; 2003–2008: Iraq War; 2004: Adjara Crisis; 2004: South Ossetia clashes 2006: Kodori Crisis; 2007: Bokhundjara incident 2008: Russo-Georgian war: Battle of Tskhinvali; 2012: Lopota incident 2014: ISAF Afghanistan (Rangers); 2015–2021: RSM Afghanistan (Rangers)
- Website: sof.mod.gov.ge/en

Commanders
- Current commander: Col. Temur Klateishvili
- Notable commanders: Gocha Karkarashvili; Nikoloz Janjgava; Zaza Gogava

The Georgian Special Operations Command (Georgian: სპეციალური ოპერაციების სარდლობა) are the special operations forces component of the Defense Forces of Georgia. They have been established to conduct special operations, special-and long range reconnaissance, military counter intelligence, counter terrorism, counter insurgency, amphibious and asymmetric warfare in and outside Georgia.

Georgian special operation forces are subordinated under the MOD Special Operations Main Division to a brigade-level command structure. Each formation is split into several sub-divisions which are allocated on different Georgian regions, cities and strategically important areas. Most instructor units are composed of veterans of past conflicts including the Soviet–Afghan War and the internal conflicts in Georgia. Officers and instructors served as in former Soviet Army or NATO special services.

== History ==
The very first such formation was founded during the War in Abkhazia in 1992. At the time there was no clear division between paramilitary and military units, while cadres that received training from former Soviet and Russian instructors generally enjoyed more popularity among the Georgian leadership.

A lot of effort was put into the establishment of a sustainable system of development of special military units, which was achieved in 1999. In order to replace the Soviet model with something that would approximate the highest international standards, the so-called SOF Train and Equip Program was established with financial and material assistance from Turkey. Some officers had already completed Army Ranger and special forces courses in the United States. Because Georgia lacked the infrastructure and means at that time, the first applicants and candidates for Georgian special forces were sent to Turkey to train there. Since 2001, Georgia has intensified the training of its elite forces in cooperation with American, French, British, Israeli and other countries' special services.

In 2002 as part of the United States's Georgia Train and Equip Program over 2,000 soldiers including 1,000 paramilitary troops were trained by US instructors for special-and counter-terrorism operations. About $65 million were invested by the United States for the training of 400 army commandos and state security forces. In the framework of said program over $6 million were committed by the Georgian government itself to properly arm and supply the country's special forces battalion so that training in accordance to US and NATO standards was ensured.

The US 10th Special Forces Group of SOCOM was tasked with assisting in setting up the proper infrastructure and training ground for Georgia's special operations forces, identified by NATO as GSOF. Georgian commandos were part of KFOR, played a limited role during the 2001 Macedonia insurgency and participated in the Iraq War from 2003 until the complete withdrawal of the Georgian contingent in 2008 due to an escalation of hostilities in South Ossetia. Another $11.5 million were raised by the US in 2008 for special forces training. However, as a result of the Russo-Georgian conflict the US ceased providing any type of assistance in training Georgian forces, including special forces as unofficial and undeclared embargoes were in full effect against the country until a new government took over in 2012.

Despite that brief setback a foundation had been laid, and Georgia's elite units became much less dependent on foreign assistance. Instead, focus was shifted towards cooperation, bilateral exercises and inter-operability with their NATO and European, particularly Eastern European counterparts. Georgian special forces have taken part in numerous international missions and joint exercises. Following the 2014 Wales summit joint training exercises between US-and Georgian special forces officially renewed and since then are held on a regular basis. Several NATO certifications were achieved in 2017 following multinational manoeuvers.

Another close partner besides SOCOM is the Polish Special Forces Command, in particular JW GROM, JWK and JW AGAT which took part in the general assessment, mentoring and qualification leading to a NATO operational certification for GSOF. The years-long assessment and enhancement of operational capabilities culminated in a final certification during a 2017 exercise in which several Polish special forces components played the opposing force against their Georgian counterparts. GSOF are thereby NATO certified and qualified to operate a Special Operations Task Group or SOTG within Alliance structures, which is unique for non-Nato countries. Joint exercises and qualification with Polish SOF are commenced on a regular basis since 2013.

=== Early 1990s ===
Several elite units were created in 1992. Those included Omega and Alpha, as well as another undisclosed special unit of the State Security. They were formed under the supervision of Igor Giorgadze, who took orders directly from then-Chairman of the Parliament Eduard Shevardnadze.

In contrast to their Soviet counterparts, the Georgian units were not specialized in counter-terrorism, instead deployed into conflict zones shortly after their establishment. They acted as combat and intelligence assets for the military. Alpha was also trained in assassination of HVTs, which caused great controversy in connection with some murder cases, and the attempted assassinations of the Georgian head of state, that remain unsolved to this date.

While Omega received training from Western instructors, the members of Alpha were trained and headed primarily by decorated Georgian veterans of the Soviet–Afghan War and former KGB officers, as well as Russian officers from Spetsnaz GRU. Some of whom were recruited and initially part of Alpha to participate in the 1990s conflicts, on the Georgian side. Alpha had various military hardware at its disposal, including armored personnel carriers and artillery, but operated mostly covertly. It was the only unit in the country at the time that could equip its soldiers with state of the art Western and Soviet communication devices, which enabled the accurate execution of operations, and a constant line of communication with the government. This technology was otherwise a rarity to non-existent, in the mostly poorly-organized and poorly-equipped Georgian military.

The unit strictly opposed the violent behaviour of autonomous paramilitary groups such as Mkhedrioni who committed ethnically-motivated crimes, and forbade its members to partake in such actions under the threat of capital punishment. Their good standing with the local populace and ethnic minorities kept the unit supplied and informed. Alpha gained a reputation mostly for accomplishing tasks with great deception and swiftness, and with as little bloodshed as possible.

Examples include the surprise raid and recapture of Khobi from rebels, spreading misinformation among opposition forces that resulted in the unit securing strategically vital locations for the government, such as the port city Poti, disarming insurrectionist groups and recovering military equipment captured by the enemy.

Many successes were achieved partially due to recruiting or employing the help of ethnic minorities. Alpha would send small diverse teams of four in civilian or other suitable disguise, and often with its Russian members, to successfully infiltrate hostile territory and on some occasions also the Russian headquarters in Gudauta, in order to gather intelligence for military action. However, the Alpha unit would not engage in direct combat operations in Abkhazia as it was mostly tasked with confronting Zviadist forces in Georgia proper. It also carried out a number of successful hostage rescue operations, but its inexperience and bold approach with such situations resulted in friction between them and the police, and sometimes near disasters. Alpha would be officially disbanded in 1995 following several controversial events and trials.

The "White Eagles", one of the few professional units of the Georgian military at the time, National Guard specifically, were part of the garrison in the coastal town Gagra which was struck by a massed separatist assault during the War in Abkhazia. Despite initial success for the defenders Gagra was eventually overrun. Russian involvement became very apparent in that period when an unidentified force consisting of hundreds of soldiers with unmarked uniforms were landed at the coast south of the town and started to push against the Georgian defences. Part of the same force also headed towards Gagra.

In the ensuing battle, which was costly for both sides, Gocha Karkarashvili, the leader of the White Eagles, and 11 of his men were killed defending Gagra. All sides kept commencing raids and skirmishes against each other after the war and specifically throughout the late 1990s.

=== Pankisi Gorge crisis ===
In 2002 Georgian troops carried out operations in the Pankisi Gorge, which at the time was host to Chechen separatist militants sheltering from the war in Russia, and foreign - mostly Arab - jihadists. Multiple large-scale operations were carried out in the Gorge, mostly by the Internal Troops of Georgia, who set up checkpoints and carried out patrols.

In addition, Georgian special forces appear to have been involved in at least two individual operations. On 28 April a Georgian unit, acting on U.S. intelligence and led by a U.S.-trained commander, ambushed a group of insurgents in Pankisi by ramming their vehicle, and then firing on it, killing the driver. The ambush sparked consternation among militants in the area, who initiated 24-hour patrols and lookouts. The Georgians captured three Arabs, of whom one, a Yemeni named Omar Mohammed Ali al-Rammah, was subsequently transferred to U.S. custody and incarcerated in Guantanamo Bay.

In Early October, according to one report, "Georgian special forces" captured 15 Arabs in Pankisi, among them the Al-Qaeda leader known as Saif al-Islam al-Masri. Other reports referred to al-Masry's capture having taken place earlier, in the summer, and to "over 13" Arab fighters having been turned over to the U.S. that Autumn by Georgia. By late October, according to yet another report, Georgia had netted about a dozen Arab militants, including "two mid-level Al-Qaeda leaders."

According to Yevgeny Primakov, Prime Minister of Russia from 1998-1999, Georgian special forces captured a number of other rebels in Pankisi during 2002, and transferred them to Russian control, which had the effect of defusing the crisis. Primakov wrote that some saw this as the result of pressure from the United States, who wanted to stabilise Russian-Georgian relations.

=== South Ossetia 2008 ===
Georgian special operations forces took part in several engagements of the 2008 war. They supported a mobile task force consisting of Interior Ministry special forces that formed the spearhead for the assault on Tskhinvali center. Their most notable involvement was in the attack on general Khrulyov's command battalion on 9 August. Early Russian reports gave full credit to Georgian commandos for the near complete destruction of the trapped unit. However, later Russian claims suggest it was more likely part of a combined assault from different military elements including armor. In either case, the Georgian special forces engaged in fighting were fewer in numbers but able to disrupt and stall much larger enemy forces until the general withdrawal. There are also claims that Russian special forces prevented Georgian saboteurs from damaging or destroying the Roki tunnel, Russia's main supply line for the conflict region. One special forces member is confirmed to have died in the war. Sergeant Kakhaber Tavgorashvili, who was assistant counter-terrorist instructor, was reportedly killed by an Ossetian sniper at Shanghai street in Tskhinvali on 8 August. Some 55 sustained mostly light injuries as a result of fighting and shelling.

=== Claims of Georgian special forces activities in Russia and Abkhazia ===
In May 2008, Russia's domestic intelligence service, the FSB, said that a Chechen man working for Georgian intelligence had been giving cash to separatists across the North Caucasus. "This confirms that Georgian special forces have participated in subversive terrorist activities in the North Caucasus," an FSB source told Interfax. Georgian officials rejected the accusations.

In July 2012, Abkhazia announced the creation of an anti-sabotage squad in the Gali district, in order to respond to alleged "provocations coming from the Georgian side."

=== Lopota Valley ===
In 2012 one combat medic of the special forces, corporal Vladimer Khvedelidze, was killed during a controversial engagement with 20 armed militants crossing the Georgian-Dagestani border. According to the official version, security forces were reinforced by military after a group of armed men took locals hostage and demanded ransom. The local residents were released when a trapped border guard officer offered himself as a hostage instead insisting he had a much higher value for them. The armed group was offered negotiations but refused the unprofitable conditions and threatened to take the negotiator. In that moment Georgia's anti-terror unit opened fire and killed one of the militants. During the firefight 10 more were killed but also one MIA security officer. In midst of the shootout, the army special forces corpsman tried to evacuate a wounded officer but got attacked and both men died on the spot.

== Participation in International Peacekeeping Missions ==
=== Kosovo Force ===
Georgia's first involvement in peacekeeping operations was part of the KFOR mission. In 1999 a platoon consisting of 34 members of the newly formed unit was stationed in Mamuša as part of the Turkish contingent. They were distinguishable by their shoulder patches and berets but used Turkish equipment. Their primary task was to provide security to the town and protect ethnic minorities from reprisal and violence. Later the contingent was reinforced by an infantry company under German command. During the 2001 insurgency in Macedonia the special forces platoon was deployed at the border to combat and disarm insurgent forces that intended to cross over into Kosovo.

=== Operation Iraqi Freedom ===
In August 2003 Georgia deployed a 70 men strong detachment to Iraq. The contingent consisted of special forces, a sapper unit and medical personnel. The special forces were stationed in Baiji, Iraq and served as QRF. Their task was to respond to insurgent attacks on Coalition forces and other peacekeeping elements as well as conduct patrols, provide base security, VIP and convoy protection in conjunction with U.S. counterparts. Equipment and ammunition was provided by the U.S. They were also assisting in intercepting weapon smuggling over the Iranian border and provide security to officials. The contingent would abandon its mission in 2008 due to the outbreak of the Russo-Georgian war.

=== ISAF ===
Towards the end of the ISAF mission from March to October 2014 the former Mountain-Reconnaissance Battalion was deployed to Afghanistan, mainly stationed at the Kandahar Air Base amidst the withdrawal process. The unit's mission was to provide security and carry out patrols and combat operations as well as instruct Afghan artillery units. Prior to deployment the battalion's soldiers participated and prepared in extensive mission rehearsal exercises with U.S. troops in Hohenfels Germany.

=== Resolute Support ===
One reinforced Ranger company was deployed to Afghanistan as part of the Resolute Support Mission. It was tasked with providing security and protection to RSM headquarters. The Rangers were also part of the force that repelled the Taliban attack on the German consulate in 2016.

== Cooperation and interoperability with NATO forces ==
Georgian special operations forces work closely with, and are advised and monitored by, the US SOCOM, United Kingdom Special Forces, POL SOCC and United States Special Operations Command Europe respectively.

The US 10th Special Forces Group took a role in creating a training and education basis for GSOF to be able to conduct training and qualification befitting US and NATO standards. As of 2017 the GSOF are being prepared by SOCOM for instructor and advisory roles for conventional multinational forces and be able to assist, conduct and lead joint training exercises and international missions like their US counterparts. At the same time GSOF operators receive training by JW GROM in NATO operational procedures while working together with AGAT and qualify in Polish lead multinational special forces manoeuvers for NATO certifications and access to broader education. The years-long cultivation of cooperation and mutual assistance helps the GSOF align with NATO operational doctrines and prepare for eventual membership in addition to successful mission deployments alongside NATO counterparts and forces in general.

== Organization ==
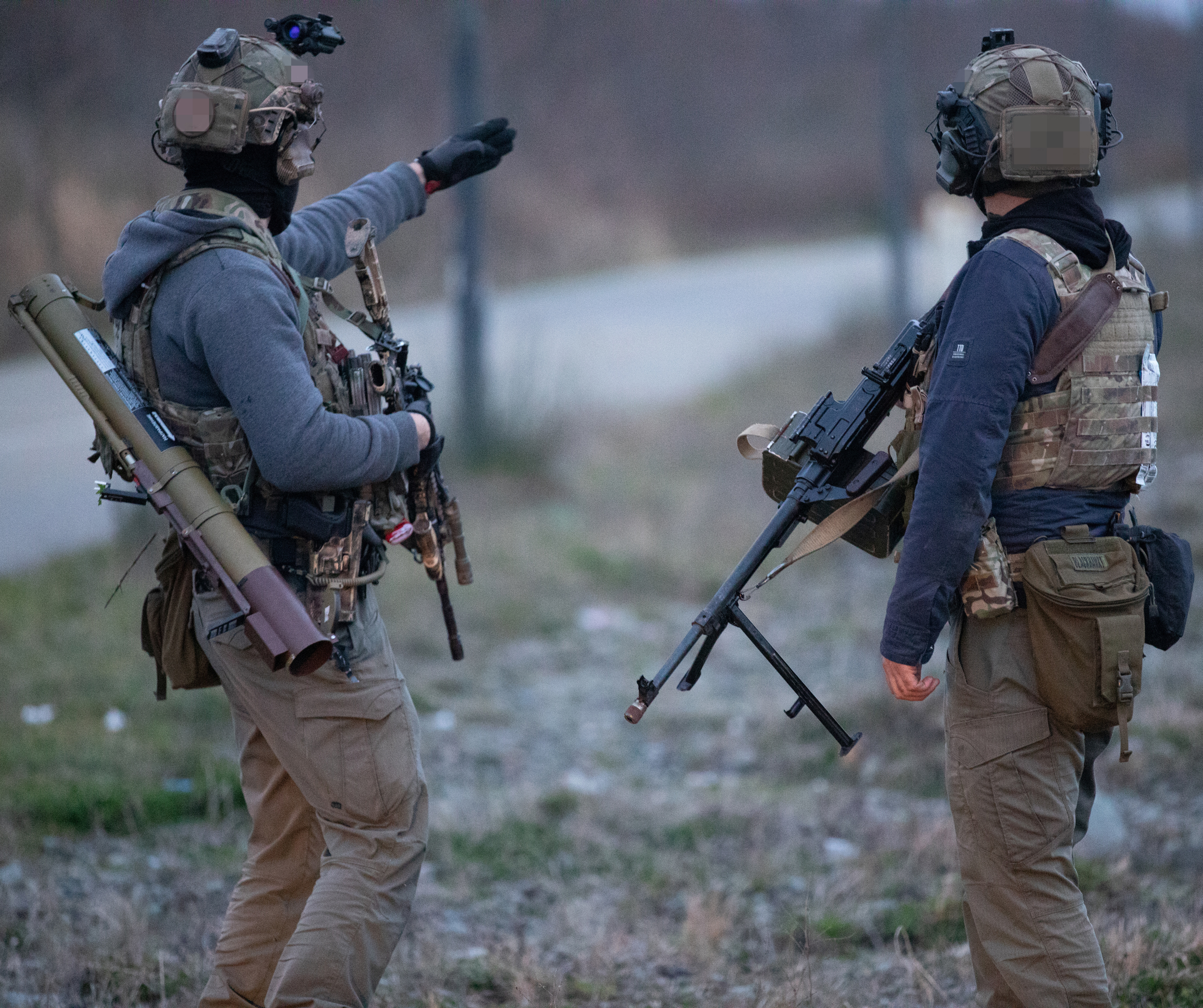
Georgian and Romanian SOF during Trojan Footprint 2024

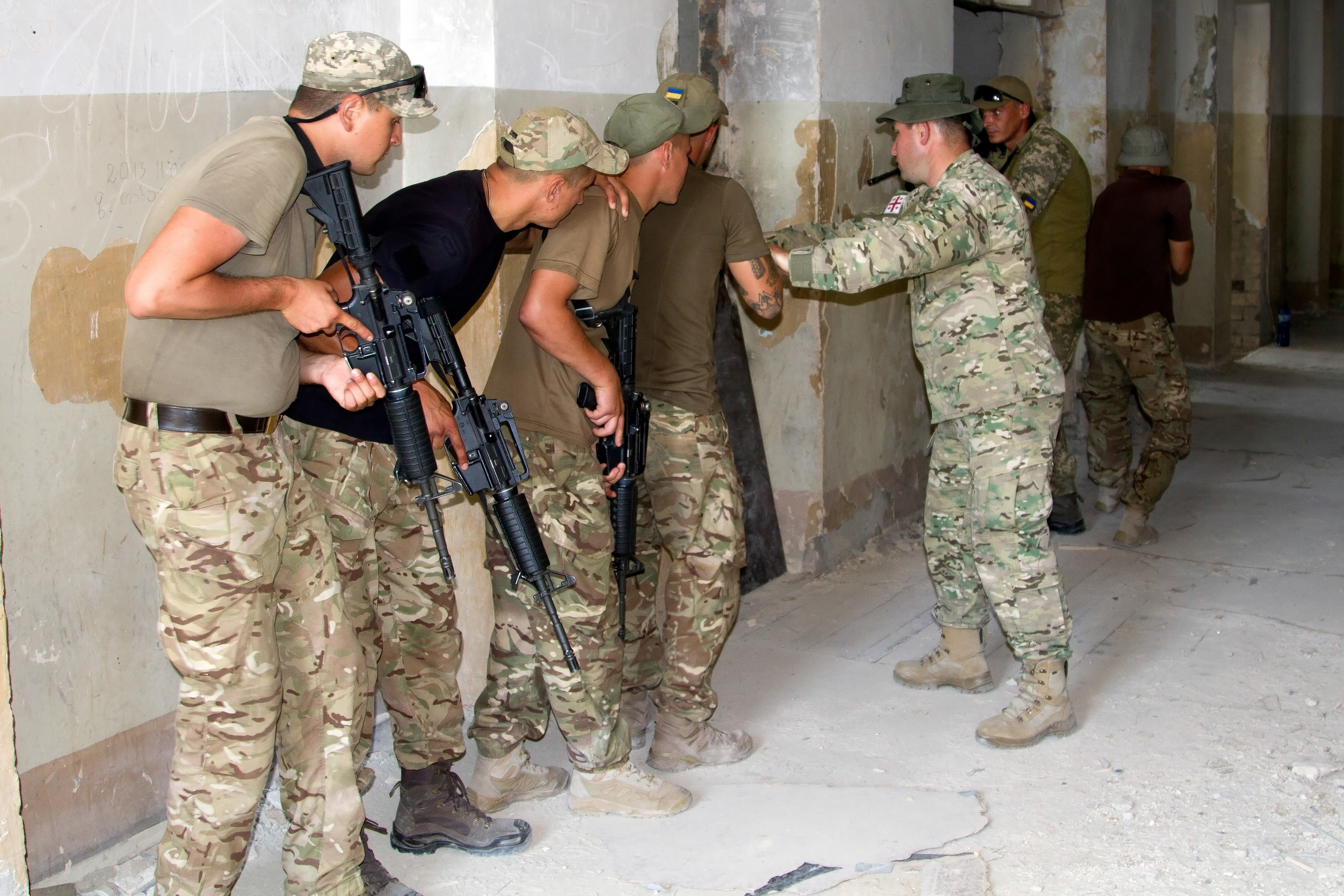
Georgian SOF teaching entry methods to Ukrainian Marines during a multinational maneuver, 2017

In 2019 the special operations forces were divided into two main operational groups for Eastern and Western Operational Command respectively: the acting formations and their sub units as two autonomous forces and the Special Operations Training Center which contains all training and educational arms of the branch.

=== Special Operations Forces ===
Structure as of 2020.

- Finance and Accounting Service
- Headquarters
- Special Operations Forces
  - Special Operations Battalion
    - Naval Special Operations Squadron ( Company )
  - Ranger Battalion
- Special Operations Training Center named after Major Gela Chedia
- Staff Company

The Special Operations Battalion with its supplementary Frogman Company are the primary air-land-sea deployable special operations forces of the Defense Forces of Georgia. They are subordinate to the primary HQ but as part of the respective autonomous military commands, maintain their own sub divisions such as staffs, control-communications & counterintelligence, medical, logistics and supply unit as well other supporting elements. Both units are expected to carry out the full spectrum of special operations, including direct action, special reconnaissance and support tasks in their assigned areas of operation. The Naval Special Operations Squadron provides the naval warfare components of the force and is responsible for the training and development in that area. There is always at least one team from each company in full combat readiness, while the rest conduct training, exercises and education classes. In a constant cycle numerous types of firing drills are being exercised through day and night by one group while another group is training on explosives, a third one in hand-to-hand combat, a fourth in weapons specialisation and so forth. The Ranger Battalion was established as SOF support component in 2009.

=== Special Operations Training Center ===
The training center consists of following:

- Staff

-S1 -S2 -S3 -S4 -S5 -S6 -S7

- Command
- Special Operations School
- Rangers Preparation School
- Snipers Preparation School
- Paratroopers Preparation School
- Evaluation Development Section
- Logistical Support & Transport Company

Function and mission of the training center is to ensure the development of programs for the development of military servicemen for special subunits, organize and conduct basic courses of special military training in accordance to specialization and provide training and further retraining of the personnel and / or collectively qualified military personnel within the competence. The school certifies successful graduates and subdivisions.

== Women in the special operations forces ==
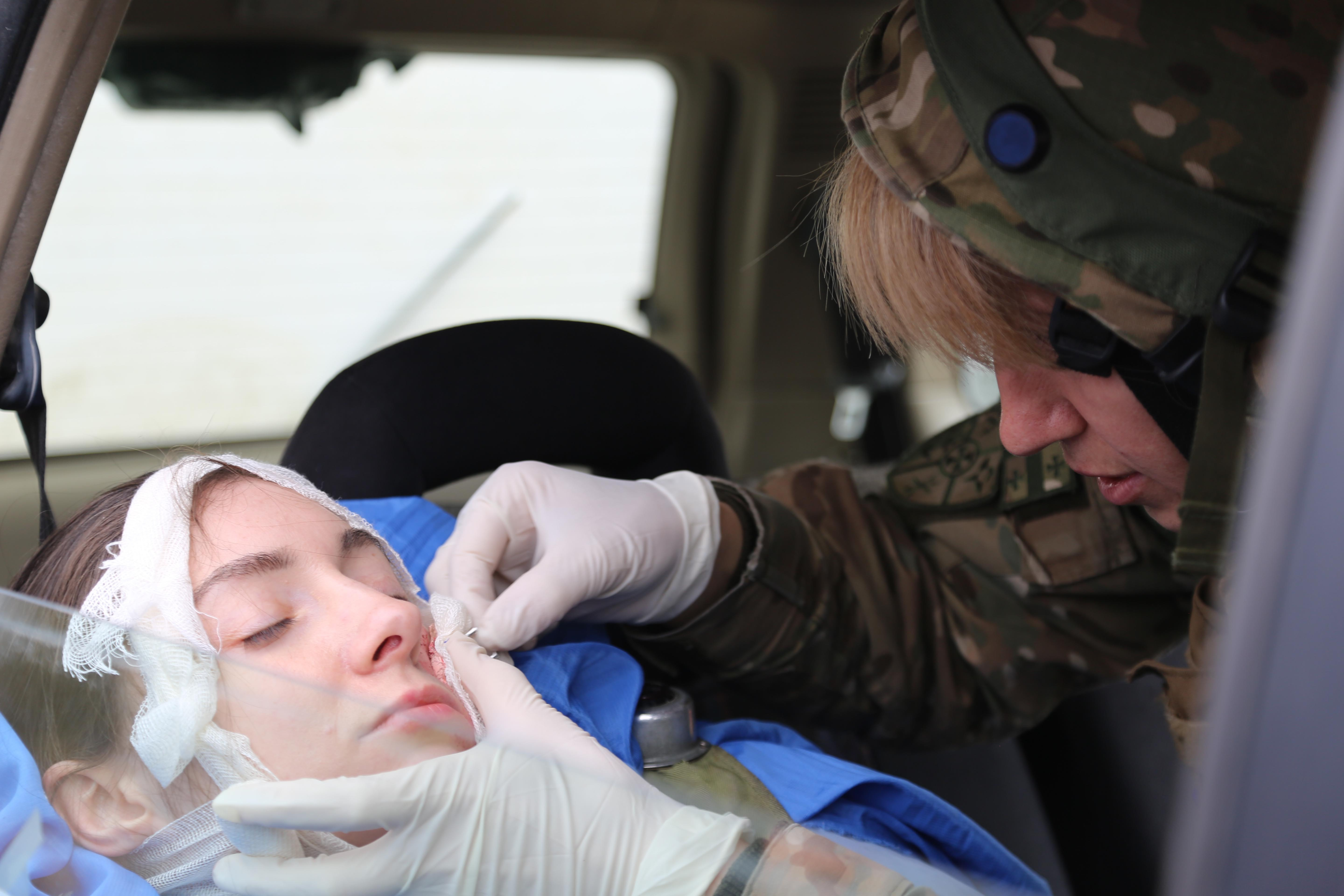
Female member of the former Special Mountain Battalion attending to wounded during exercises, 2014

Apart from very few exceptions, it is generally prohibited for women to be part of the special operations forces. However, that regulation does not deny them entrance to the special operations forces in general. There have been cases of female individuals passing the application and qualification courses, in one recorded case even surpassing the scores of some of their fellow male candidates. However such individuals were excluded from combat assignment.

== Selection and courses ==
The four main education and training schools are the Special Forces School, Rangers School, Snipers School and Airborne School, which vary in admission criteria, requirements and difficulty. To become special forces member, servicemen have to successfully complete every single school. The qualification and training itself is monitored by NATO instructors of leading special forces units. In addition US and Georgian special forces regularly conduct joint training exercises. The overall admission criteria include physical, psychological health and durability. The applicants passing rate for special forces never exceeds 10% and lies usually somewhere around 5%. At least 90% of the applicants have served in peacekeeping operations. To be allowed for selection it is required to have served at least two years in the defense forces. The candidate's general abilities and physical conditions will be tested with their current commander's recommendation taken into account.

=== Ranger School ===
In order to apply for Ranger School, students are required to be active members of the defense forces "Category A" and must not be older than 30 years. Rank can vary from private to captain. The candidates will be subjected to complex logical tests in land navigation/topography, firearms and tactics. To pass the theoretical and physical exams, at least 60 out of 100 points need to be accumulated in the respective disciplines. The soldiers must know at the very least all basic principles and methods of patrolling, ambushing, raiding and associated contingencies. They are also required to be familiar with basic specifications and capabilities of certain Western and Soviet firearms, including anti-tank weapons. Subsequently, the candidates go through academic evaluation, closing modules, final physical assessment and summative situational training. If trainees lap the 70 points threshold for every single module and 80 points in the final exams, they will have successfully applied for the Ranger course. In case of failure, which includes the missing out on any training session, they will be expelled regardless of cause. The total duration of the Ranger program is 18–22 weeks.

The Rangers School is located near the village Manavi and is similar to the United States Ranger School. Throughout the course, future Rangers will be trained in leading combat operations in different weather and on different terrain such as forests / jungles, mountains and populated areas. In tense exercises the servicemen will also adopt advanced leadership capabilities and taught how to respond accordingly in a crisis or arbitrary scenario.

Applicants who pass these initial tests will be admitted to the initial preparation course, which lasts about 67 days. There they will deal with following subjects:

- Marksmanship
- Mountain Training
- Airmobile Training
- Military Topography
- Tactical Training
- Medical Training
- Communication
- Engineering Training
- Combat on Urban Terrain

During the preparation for the actual training program, the candidates will acquire the minimum of required skills and experience to pass the specialization course. Initial admission criteria are restricted to ages 18–30 inclusive, Georgian citizenship, a secondary or higher education and a positive report from the medical commission provided by the school itself. Physical requirements are: being able to perform a minimum of 50 push-ups, 50 sit-ups, running a distance of 3,200 m (10,500 ft) in 16:00 minutes or less and 8 pull-ups. The theoretical test on general skills must be passed with a rating of at least 60%. Afterward, the applicants will be interviewed in order to provide general information about their persona. During the subsequent preparation course which' duration is 18 weeks, following subjects will be engaged:

- Marksmanship
- Common Army Tactics
- Military Topography
- Medical Preparation
- Communication
- General Subjects
- Physical Training

The final stage begins after completion of all preparation courses. The applicants will receive all necessary theoretical and practical insight and training in order to be able to conduct operations under similar conditions as the Special Forces School. Admission criteria for civilians are the successful completion of the BIT/BCT (Basic Combat Training) and Rangers preparation courses. The admission tests are the same as those of the initial preparation course except the passing score for theoretical tests must be at least 70%. The theoretical tests include: Tactical Training, Marksmanship, Engineering Training, Topography, Communication and General Skills. After passing these successfully, the applicants will be admitted to the training course, which' duration is 22 weeks.

The general subjects of the course are:

- Training on Water
- Marksmanship
- Mountain Training
- Airmobile Training
- Survival
- Military Topography
- Tactical Training
- Medical Training
- Communication
- Engineering Training
- Physical Training

=== Airborne School ===
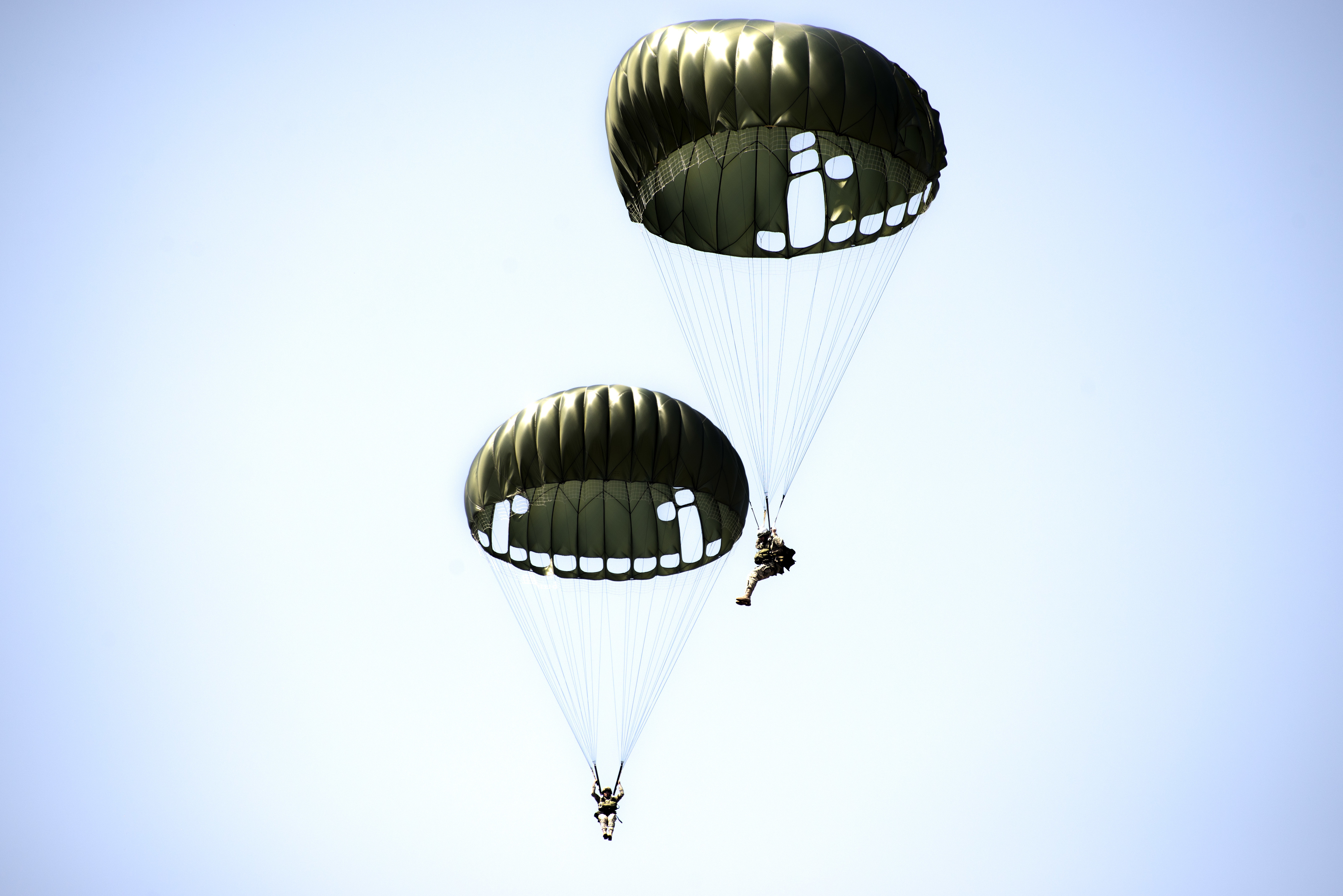
GSOF navigate to LZ after deploying from a US C-130

The airborne training is divided into Paratroopers Basic Training Course and Parachute Rigger Training Course. During the basic course, the students will be trained to carry out parachute jumps under the supervision of instructors with ram-air parachutes in light meteorological conditions, from average altitude, medium speed and with equipment and weapons. Criteria as of age is unrestricted. Any serviceman who has a satisfactory medical report will be admitted to the course which will take three weeks. Subjects will be the history of parachute development, material parts, theoretical parts of parachute jumping, rules of movement and airdrome, aircraft tour, parachute jumping elements on land, special cases during jumping, packing the parachute and practical jumps.

During the so-called Rigger course, the paratroopers will learn how to use, pack, maintain and repair the TTS, T-10B and T-10R parachutes. The course can be attended by personnel who have already passed the basic training course and carried out at least five jumps. The course program also includes two forced jumps.

Servicemen who passed both courses and can prove an overall record of 35 jumps, can apply for Land Instructor-Parachutist Training Course in which they will learn the methods of conducting theoretical parachute and land preparations, organizing parachute jumps and making records, as well as paratroopers instructor duties.

The course duration is 21 days and includes 3 days of practical jumps. The program includes seven jumps, the first, the second, the third and the fourth with equipment and weapons.

=== Special Operations School ===
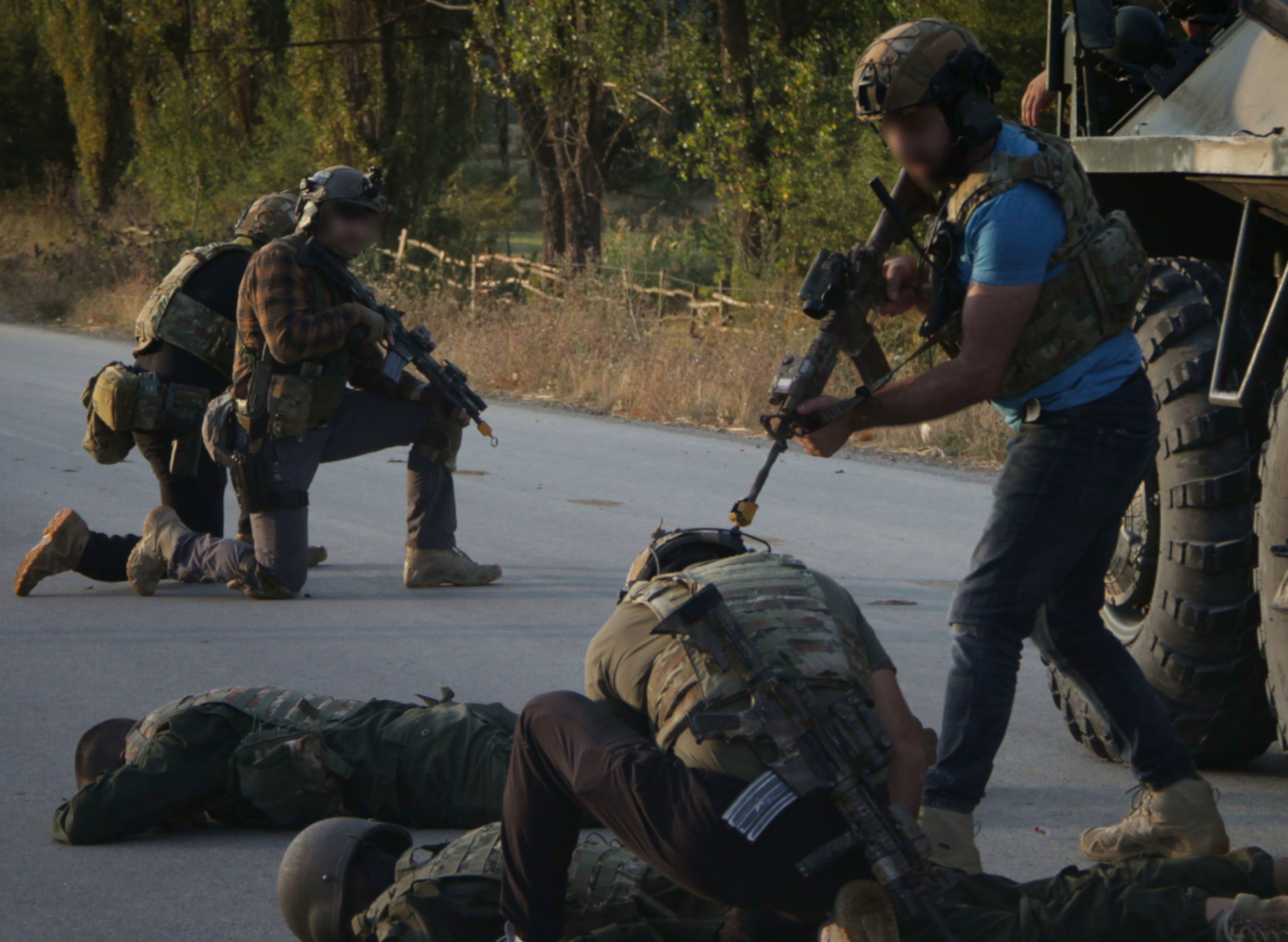
Georgian Special Forces during exercise Noble Partner 2022

The main purpose of the Special Operations School is for applicants to acquire and master necessary skill sets and insight to conduct special missions and operations. The training is conducted under tense physical and psychological pressure in simulated but realistic scenarios in order to train the ability to make prompt evaluations of situations under pressure.

Admission criteria are strictly restricted to ages 21 to 31 inclusive, attested experience in leadership is preferred. The applicants must pass every single course of the Ranger School with satisfactory results to be admitted for selection. Admission requirements for the initial application are split into physical tests which include being able to perform a minimum of 60 push-ups, 66 sit-ups, running a distance of 3,200 meters in 14:24 minutes or less and 10 pull-ups, an Intelligence test and combined tests in army awareness in which 80% of the answers must be correct and finally a recommendation and citation letter from the candidates acting unit commander.

Active servicemen who can prove a satisfactory medical report and successfully passed the entrance examinations, as well as all other requirements, will be allowed to take part in the course.

The course's duration is 39 weeks in which following subjects will be engaged:

- Marksmanship
- Mountain Training
- Airmobile Training
- Military Topography
- Tactical Training
- Medical Training
- Communication
- Engineering Training
- Command Training
- Physical Training
- Hand-to-Hand Fighting
- Preparation of Specialists
  - Preparation of medics
  - Preparation of weapon specialists
  - Preparation of engineering and demolitions specialists

Additional courses are:

- Pistol Marksmanship Special Course
- Special Naval/Combat Diver Course
- Bodyguard Course
- Antiterrorist Course.

Less than 10%, often only 5% of the applicants will pass and are annually accepted to become members of Georgia's special forces units.

=== Snipers School ===
The SF sniper school trains special forces personnel as well as regular army members from age 18 to 40 in modern sniper warfare in accordance with higher international standards.

The special forces sniper course requires special forces personnel to have a marksmanship level expert or I class to be accepted to the course. Other criteria are a Common Army Awareness Test, a Memory Test, the Shooting from Sniper Rifles, psychological tests and a physical test which equals that of Special Forces School with the exactly same requirements. Special forces personnel passing these tests will undergo a 12-week-long course engaging following subjects:

- Marksmanship
- Sniper Tactics
- Sniper Tracking
- Survival
- Special Reconnaissance

During the course, theoretical evaluations must amount 70% of correct answers.

After completion of all necessary courses until Sniper Course in a time period of 24 to 27 months or longer depending on if started as civilian or servicemen, the candidate may be granted title of Special Operations Forces Soldier. Service in the special unit grants access to the special operations groups and further education for special naval warfare or intelligence and logistics. Unit members will be taught in foreign languages and sent abroad to train together with partner nations.

== Equipment ==
=== Small Arms ===
Weapon	Photo	Origin	Notes
Glock 17; Glock 18; Glock 19 Gen 4		Austria	Primary side arm
Heckler & Koch MP5; Heckler & Koch MP5SD; Heckler & Koch MP5K		Germany	
AKS-74U		Soviet Union	Used in various configurations, mostly customized.
Mossberg 500; 590; 590A1		United States	Breaching tool
M4 carbine M4A1; M4A3		United States	Primary weapon
MKE MPT; KNT-76; MPT-55		Turkey	A number of MPT-55 and KNT-76 rifles were gifted by Turkish special forces in 2025.
AK-74; AKS-74; AK-74M		Soviet Union; Bulgaria	Used in various configurations, mostly customized. Carried by security details in Iraq.
AKM; AKMS; PM md. 63		Soviet Union; Romania	Used for exercises in Romania, and by security details in Iraq.
VSS Vintorez; AS Val		Soviet Union	Used in limited number by special mission units
IWI Negev		Israel	
M249 SAW		United States	
PK machine gun PKS; PKM		Soviet Union	GPMG
M240 Bravo		United States	GPMG
IMI Galatz		Israel	
M110		United States	
Desert Tech SRS		United States	
TRG M10		Finland	
McMillan Tac-50; Tac-338		United States	
Barrett M82; Barrett M95		United States	
RPG-7; RPG-7D		Soviet Union; Georgia	
RPG-18; RPG-22; RPG-26; PDM-1		Soviet Union; Georgia	
FGM-148 Javelin		United States	

=== Vehicles ===
Vehicle	Photo	Origin	Notes
Toyota Land Cruiser		Japan	
Land Rover Defender		Great Britain	
Humvee		United States	
Otokar Cobra		Turkey	
Didgori-2; Didgori Warrior; Warrior Mortar Carrier		Georgia	

== Comparable units ==
- USA - Green Berets
- USA - United States Army Rangers
- USA - MARSOC
- LTU - Lithuanian Special Operations Force
- POL - Polish Special Forces
- Turkey - Maroon Berets
- Turkey - Underwater Offence Group Command
