= 14th Airlift Squadron (Poland) =

Airlift squadron of the Polish Air Force

- Active: 2006 - present
- Country: Poland
- Allegiance: Polish Air Force
- Type: Airlift Squadron
- Role: Transport
- Base: 33rd Airlift Air Base

Aircraft flown
- Transport: C-130; PZL M-28 Skytruck

The 14th Airlift Squadron is a newly established airlift squadron of the Polish Air Force. The unit is stationed at the 33rd Air Base in Powidz with the 7th Tactical Squadron. The unit operates 5 newly purchased Lockheed C-130 Hercules transport aircraft, the last being accepted in formal ceremony on 22 August 2012.
