= Nil Military Unit =

NIL
- Jednostka Wojskowa NIL
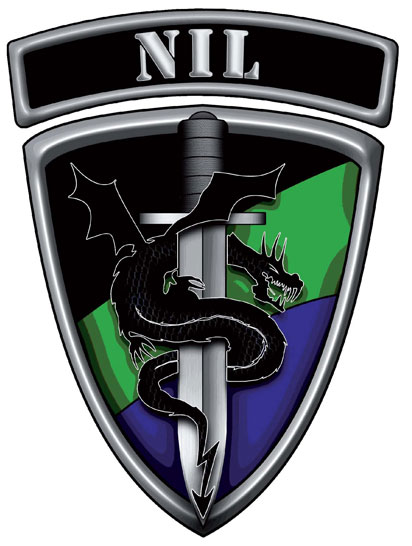
- Active: 2009–present
- Country: Poland
- Branch: Special Troops Command
- Type: Special Forces
- Role: Special reconnaissance
- Garrison/HQ: Kraków
- Patron: general August Emil Fieldorf
- Colors: Black, green, blue
- Engagements: War in Afghanistan (2001–2021)
- Website: https://nil.wp.mil.pl/

Commanders
- Current commander: płk Piotr Gomuła

The Nil military unit, commonly called JW NIL and formerly known as Jednostka Wojskowa NIL, is one of six special forces units in Polish Armed Forces.

== Mission ==
The Nil unit is tasked with conducting reconnaissance, including radio reconnaissance, image reconnaissance, personnel reconnaissance and reconnaissance analysis, supporting command and ensuring logistical support and military communications.

== History ==
The decision to start forming Nil unit was issued on 2 December 2008. The formation of the Special Forces Command and Support Support Unit took place in 2009. On 31 July 2009, the Minister of National Defence gave the unit the name of its patron – Brig. Gen. August Emil Fieldorf "Nil" and established an annual Unit Day on 6 September. On 18 March 2011, the name was changed to the Military Unit "Nil", and on the Unit Day, the avenue named after Gen. Fieldorf was opened.

The first commander of the NIL Military Unit was Brig. Gen. Mariusz Skulimowski (at that time in the rank of colonel). From January 3, 2013 to November 11, 2018, the Unit was commanded by Colonel Mirosław Krupa. In the years 2018–2023, the Unit was commanded by Colonel Andrzej Gardynik. The current commander of the NIL Military Unit is Colonel Piotr Gomuła.

Some of the soldiers of JW Nil served as part of the operational forces of the Polish Military Contingent in Afghanistan. They provided information, logistics and command support to the soldiers of JW Komandosów (TF-50) and JW Grom (TF-49) by, among others, reconnaissance IMINT using FlyEye and ScanEagle and by HUMINT.

On October 17, 2012, the operation to combat ISAF opponents and destroy the training camp in Paktika was revealed. Reconnaissance activities for the operation conducted by TF50 and Afghan policemen of Provincial Response Company Ghazni were conducted by the JW Nil sub-unit.

NIL insignias

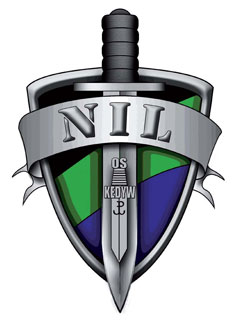
JW NIL commemorative badge

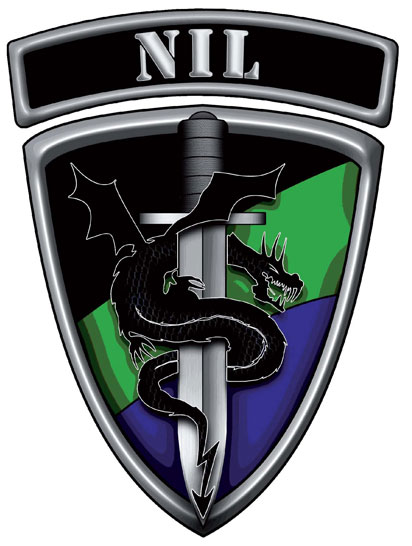
JW Nil insignia

The identification badge of the JW NIL Information Support Team for the dress uniform

The identification badge of the JW NIL Information Support Team for the field uniform

== Organization ==
- HQ Staff
- Command Team
- Logistic Security Team
- Command Team
- Information Support Team
- Medical Security Group
