= Powidz Landscape Park =

Protected area in Poland

- Powidzki Park Krajobrazowy
- IUCN category V (protected landscape/seascape)
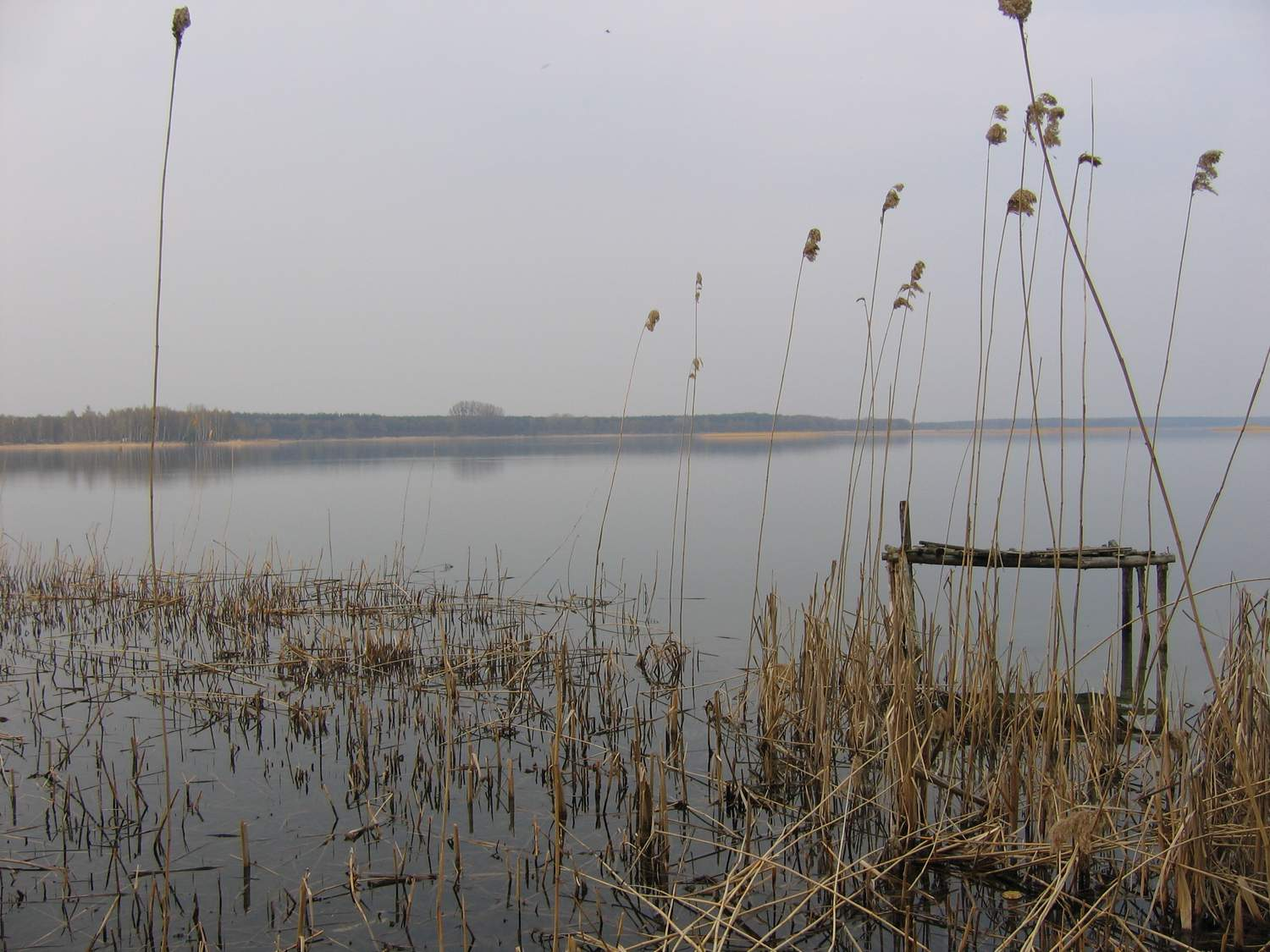
- Powidzkie Lake
- Interactive map of Powidz Landscape Park
- Location: Greater Poland Voivodeship
- Coordinates: 52°25′N 17°55′E
- Area: 246 km^{2} (95 sq mi)
- Established: 1998

Powidz Landscape Park (Powidzki Park Krajobrazowy) is a protected area (Landscape Park) in west-central Poland, established in 1998, covering an area of 246 square kilometres (95 sq mi).

The Park lies within Greater Poland Voivodeship, in Słupca County (Gmina Słupca). It takes its name from the village of Powidz.

== Fauna ==
There are 196 species of birds and 34 mammals in the park. The species composition of amphibians (12) and reptiles (5) does not differ much from the surrounding areas. There are 22 species of fish in the park's lakes.

The heraldic animal of the Park is the otter, which, due to the numerous lakes with a varied shoreline, good water quality and large fish populations, is relatively numerous (although no detailed quantitative data are available). In the valleys of the watercourses flowing through the Park, traces of the presence of beavers can be observed. The American mink is an alien, invasive mammal species found in the Park and probably exerting a significant negative impact on the populations of water birds [4]. Apart from the mammal species typical for the forest ecosystems of Wielkopolska, elk is regularly observed in the Park.
