= Formoza Military Unit =

Polish Special Forces unit

Military Unit Formoza
- Jednostka Wojskowa Formoza
- Emblem of the unit
- Founded: 1975
- Country: Poland
- Branch: Polish Special Forces
- Type: Special forces
- Headquarters: Gdynia
- Nickname: Formoza
- Mottos: Zaufaj morzu, ono cię ocali; 'Trust the sea, it will save you'
- Engagements: Iraq occupation, War in Afghanistan
- Website: formoza.wp.mil.pl

Commanders
- Current commander: kmdr Jan Kwiatkowski

Insignia
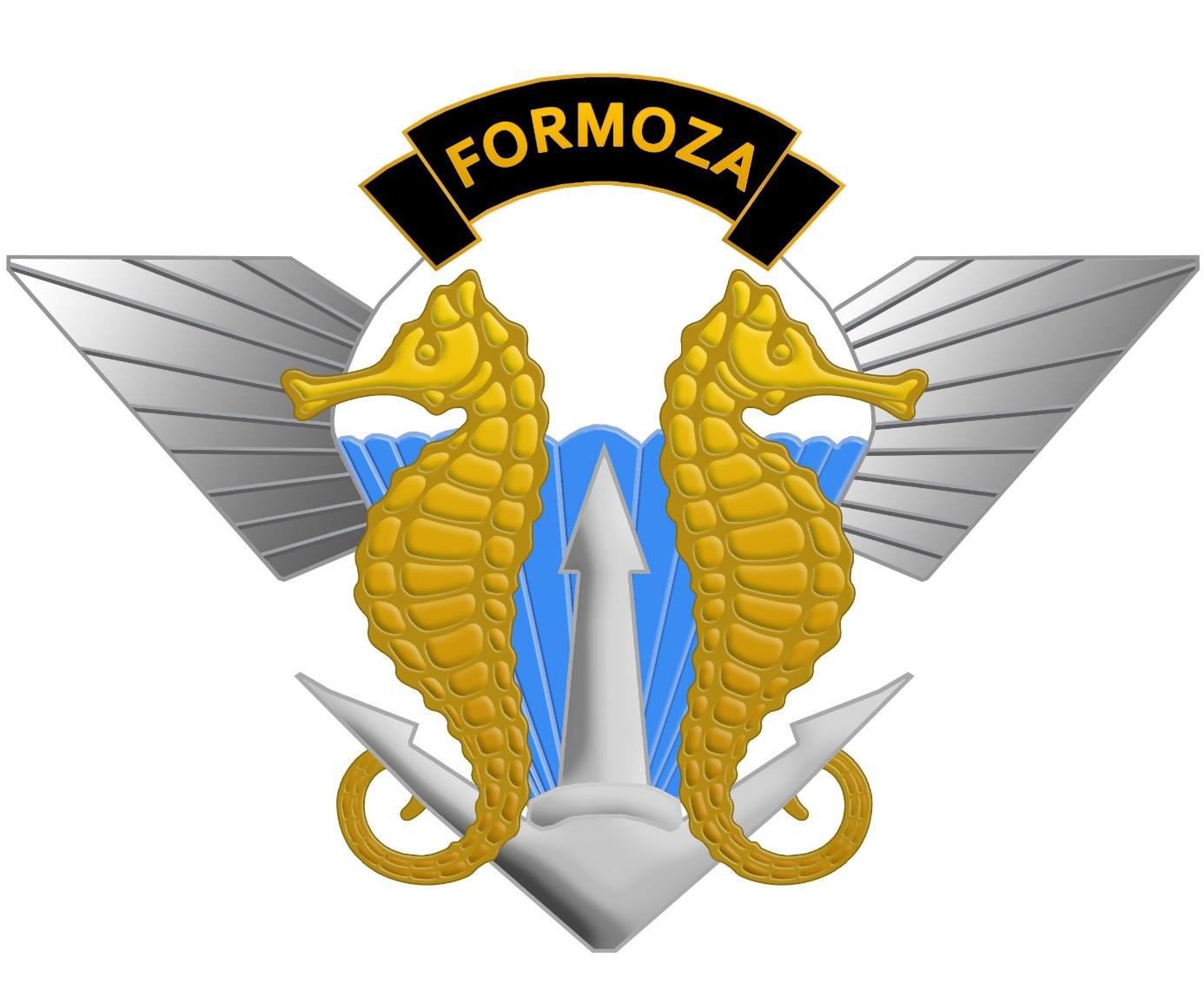
- Distinctive unit insignia (since 2019)

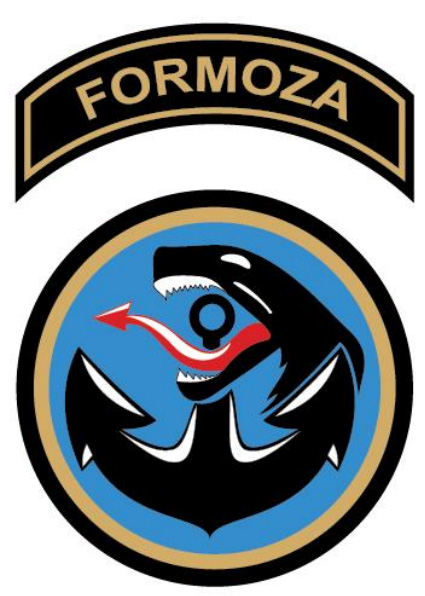
- Shoulder sleeve insignia

Jednostka Wojskowa Formoza, (Military Unit Formoza) is a special forces unit of the Polish Armed Forces within the Polish Special Forces. Between 2007 and 2011 it was known as Morska Jednostka Działań Specjalnych, MJDS) (Naval Special Operations Unit), and its previous names include Sekcje Działań Specjalnych Marynarki Wojennej (Polish Navy Special Operations Sections) and Grupy Specjalne Płetwonurków (Special Frogmen Groups).

== History ==
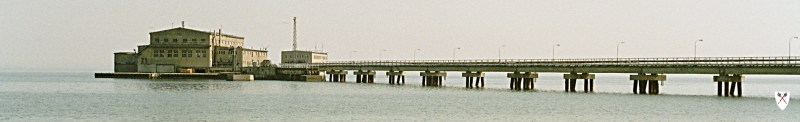
A headquarters of Formoza in a former torpedo test platform "Formoza" 54°32′55″N 18°34′02″E.

JWF is now part of Wojska Specjalne (1975-2008 - part of the Polish Navy). The Formoza was founded in 1975. Its first commanding officer was (now a retired) certified commander, kmdr por. dypl. Józef Rembisz. The Research Group on Marine Divers (Zespół Badawczy ds. Płetwonurków Morskich) was created in 1974 in order to develop a concept for the organisation and formation of a specialized marine sabotage division.

The unit was originally intended to comprise three sections of frogmen, a technical section, section and management. But it was necessary to change this premise; a frogman could not go under the water without a safety leash. It was found possible to omit this regulation. A basic team now consists of a pair formed to safeguard each other, three pairs create a special group, five groups – a section. At the very beginning, conscripted soldiers served in the unit, nowadays the unit is entirely professional, which has increased its operating effectiveness. A three-year training system was preserved, for instance, during the first year, mainly shooting, swimming long distances, driving vehicles and foreign languages are practiced.

In September 1987, the unit changed its name to Special Operations Department and the Special Naval Frogman Groups were created in 1990. The unit has formidable striking power, two frogmen may sink or take control of an enemy's ship, several of them may block even a large group of ships. The current official name Formoza comes from a Polish Navy seamen nickname of unit's training base "Formoza" (from relation between mainland, coast and island like PRC and ROC Taiwan - Formosa) - a former WW2 German torpedo test platform, 500 m away from coast in Gdynia Naval Harbour (Formoza means Formosa in Polish).

== Present Day ==
The headquarters are stationed in Gdynia, Poland. It is subordinated to Wojska Specjalne. Reportedly, the Special Operations Sections consist of six groups and a base. Jednostka Wojskowa Formoza is prepared for special operations in times of peace, crisis and war. Its basic tasks include the carrying out of operations on the sea, under water and in on-shore facilities, as well as land special operations. Usually the Formoza co-operates with a water subunit of the JW Grom, the frogmen subunit of the Jednostka Wojskowa Komandosów (formerly 1 Pułk Specjalny Komandosów) and some of its equivalents in the navies of the states belonging to NATO.

== Equipment ==
Standard armament of the mariners from the Special Operations Sections:

- 9×19mm SIG Sauer P226 pistol,
- 9×19mm MP5A3 & MP5N pistol,
- 5.56×45mm H&K G36KV assault rifle
- .300 AAC Blackout with conversion kits to 5.56×45mm NATO and 7.62×39mm SIG MCX
- 5.56×45mm FN Minimi Para machine gun
- 7.62×51mm M14 rifle
- 7.62×51mm Accuracy International Arctic Warfare sniper rifle
