= 33rd Air Base =

Polish Air Force base near Powidz

Coordinates: 52°22′53″N 17°51′04″E

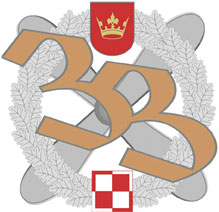
33rd Air Base
- 33. Baza Lotnicza
- Near Powidz, Słupca County in Poland
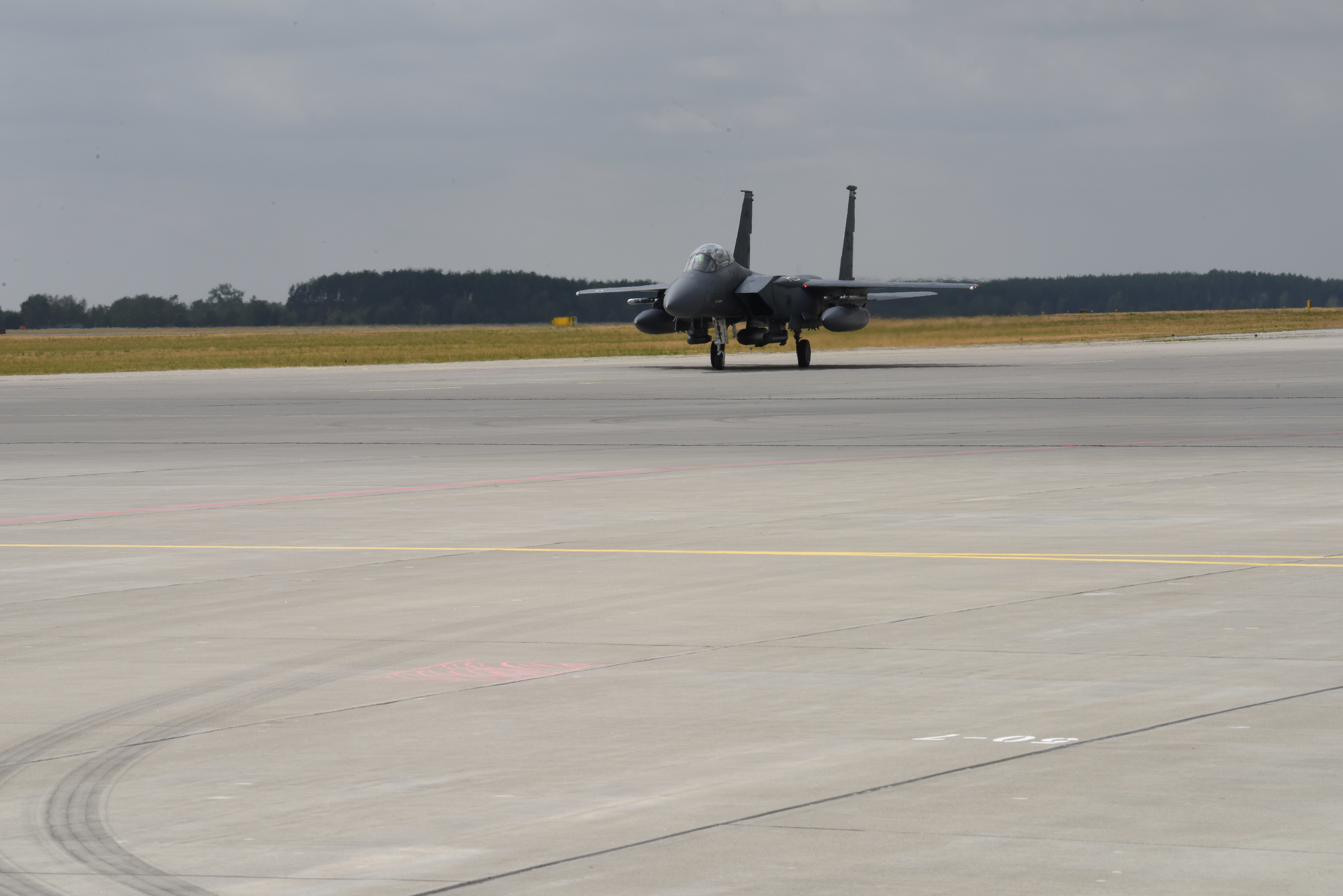

Site information
- Owner: Ministry of Defence
- Operator: Polish Air Force

Site history
- Built: 2010
- In use: 1 July 2010 – present

Garrison information
- Current commander: Colonel Miroslaw Łusiarczyk
- Garrison: 14th Airlift Squadron

Airfield information
- Identifiers: ICAO: EPPW
- Elevation: 267 feet (81 m) AMSL
Runways
Direction	Length and surface
10L/28R	8,999 feet (2,743 m) Asphalt
10R/28L	11,532 feet (3,515 m) Asphalt

The 33rd Air Base (Polish: 33. Baza Lotnicza) is a Polish Air Force base, located near Powidz. The base functions within the structure of the Polish Air Force and is part of the three wings of Powidz air transport command.

== History ==
The base was officially constituted in January 2000 as the 21st airbase, replacing the disbanded 7th Bomber-Reconnaissance Aviation Regiment. It was redesignated to its current name in January 2001. In 2010, the 2nd Airlift Squadron disbanded and its units were distributed among the newly formed units of the 33rd Air Base.

== US military ==
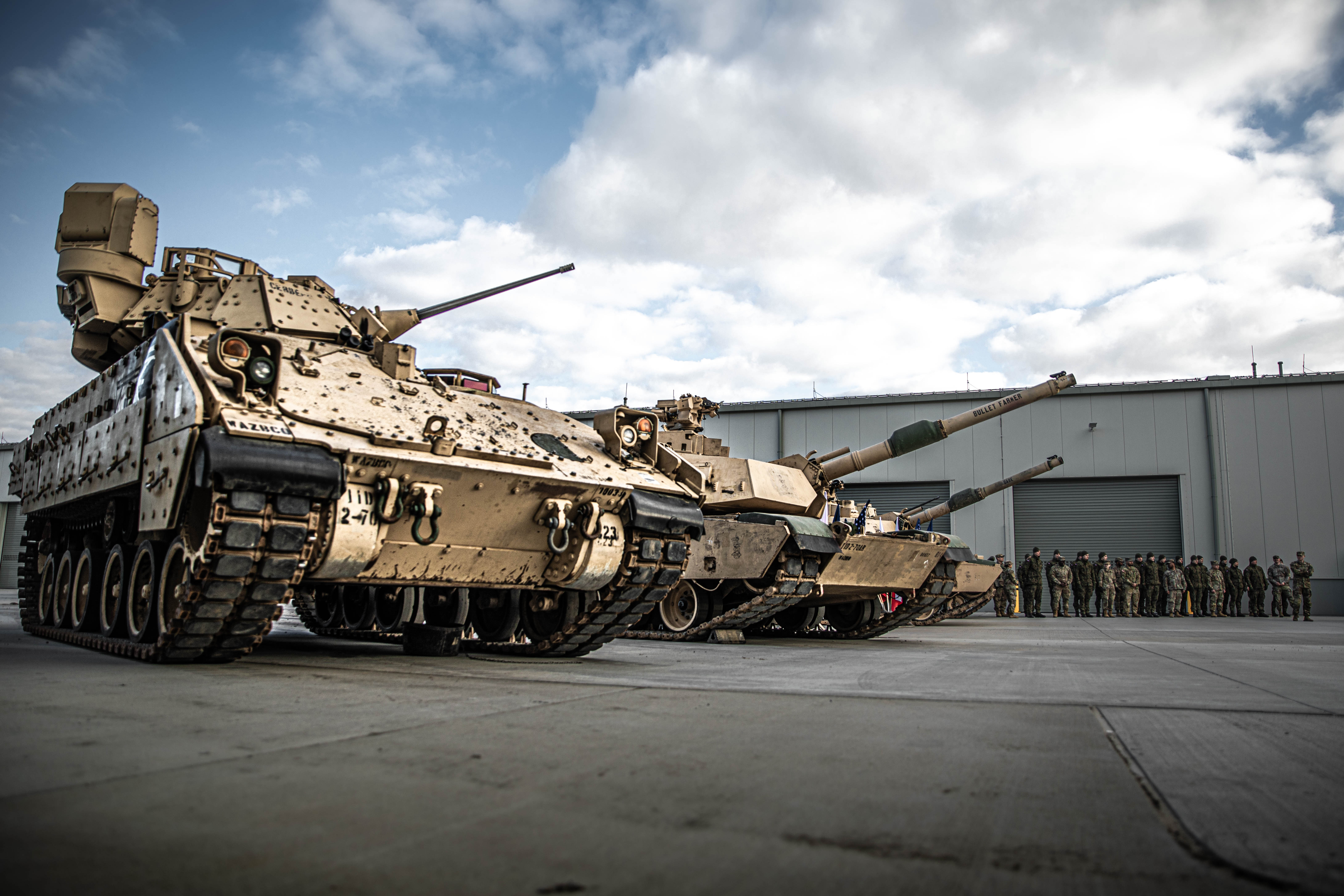
U.S. Army M2A3 and M1A2s at the Long Term Equipment Storage and Maintenance-Complex opening ceremony, April 2023

From the summer of 2019, the base will be the site of a depot and storage site for United States Army combat vehicles in Poland. It will be mostly funded by NATO's NATO Security Investment Program, and cost around US$210m, with the USA's component capped at around 20-25%.

The US Army Corps of Engineers made an industry solicitation in 2018 requesting tree-cutting services for 38 hectares (94 acres) around the base. Two US investments could be sacrificed to pay for President Trump's border wall with Mexico: A bulk fuel storage facility at US$21m, and a "rail extension and railhead" project budgeted at US$14m.
