= Polish Special Forces =

Special Troops Command
- Wojska Specjalne
- Military eagle
- Founded: 2007
- Country: Poland
- Type: Special forces command
- Size: 5 000 soldiers (2025)
- Part of: Polish Armed Forces
- Garrison/HQ: Kraków
- Engagements: Operation Uphold Democracy; War in Afghanistan; Iraq War; Syrian civil war

Commanders
- Chief of the General Staff: Gen. broni Rajmund Andrzejczak
- General Commander: Gen. broni Jarosław Mika
- Special Operations Component Commander: Gen. bryg. Sławomir Drumowicz

Insignia
- Flag

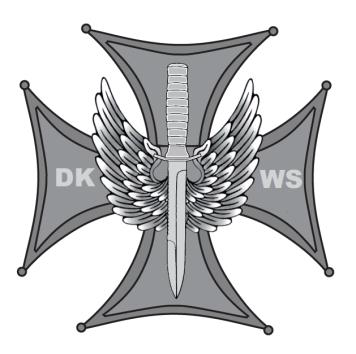
- Special Operations Component Command distinctive unit insignia (since 2022)

The Special Troops Command (Polish: Wojska Specjalne) is the special forces command of the Polish Armed Forces (SZ RP). The command was formed in 2007 and is the fourth military branch of the SZ RP.

== Composition ==
The Special Troops Command (Dowództwo Wojsk Specjalnych) is based in Kraków and comprises:

- Jednostka Wojskowa GROM, or GROM, based in Warsaw and Gdańsk
- Jednostka Wojskowa Komandosów, or JWK, based in Lubliniec
- Jednostka Wojskowa Formoza, or JW FORMOZA, is based in Gdynia
- Jednostka Wojskowa Agat, or AGAT, based in Gliwice
- Jednostka Wojskowa NIL, or NIL, is based in Kraków
- Special Operations Aviation Unit based in Powidz; only operational command it is part of the Air Force.

== Structure ==
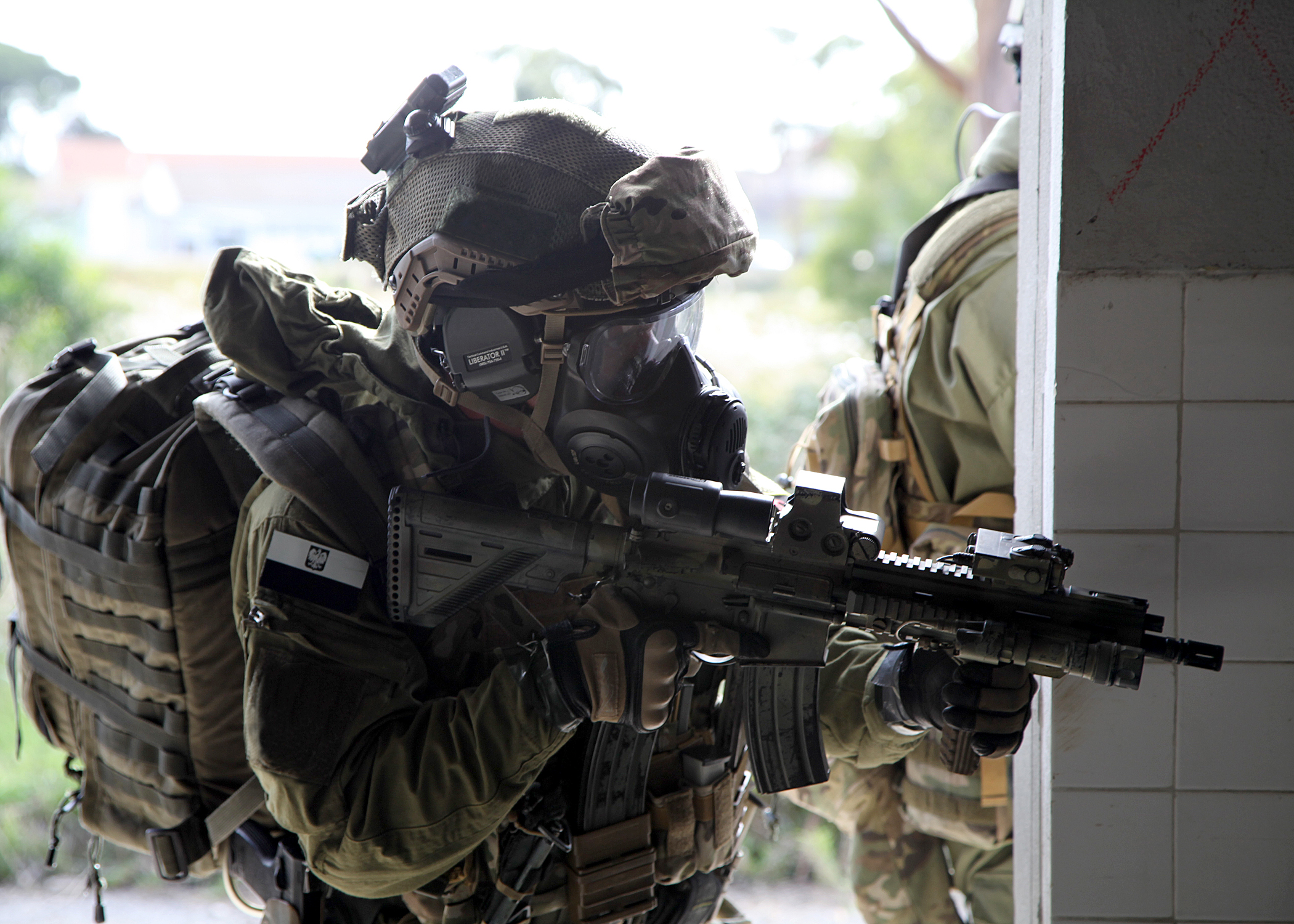
Multi-role exploitation Reconnaissance Team (MRT) during NATO exercise Trident Juncture 15

JW GROM - Operational-Maneuver Response Group "Cichociemni" (Silent Unseen)

- Command and Support Staff – in Warsaw
- Combat Team A (ZB A) – Land Element located in Warsaw
- Combat Team B (ZB B) – Maritime Element located in Gdańsk
- Combat Team C (ZB C) – Specialty unknown located in Warsaw
- Logistic and Security Unit - located in Warsaw

JW Komandosów - Army Commandos

- Command and Security – insignia of the Batalion Zośka from the Polish Home Army
- Combat Team A (ZB A) – insignia of the Batalion Miotła from the Polish Home Army and insignia of PSBS
- Combat Team B (ZB B) – Combined Operations insignia of the No. 10 (Inter-Allied) Commando unit and its No. 6 Troop (Polish)
- Combat Team C (ZB C) – insignia of the Batalion Parasol from the Polish Home Army
- Combat Team D (ZB D) – set up in 2016
- Information Support Group
- Special Forces Training Center

JW Formoza – name comes from the colloquial name of the units base, the post-German torpedo house in Gdynia, called "Formoza".

- Special Operations Squadron - at least six special operations sections and a base unit

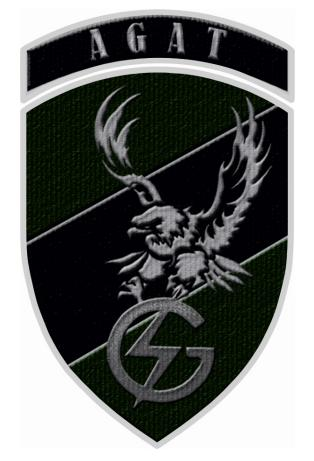
JW AGAT shoulder patch

JW AGAT – formed on the basis of the Special Branch of the Military Police in Gliwice. Named after "Agat" (abbreviation of anty-gestapo) special unit of the Polish Home Army

- HQ Staff and Command Group
- Assault Group A
- Assault Group B
- Assault Group C
- Combat Support Team
- Logistics Security Team
- Medical Security Group

JW NIL – Support Unit of Command and Security of Special Forces

- HQ Staff
- Command Team
- Logistics Security Team
- Information Support Team
- Medical Security Group

Special Operations Aviation Unit – based in Powidz

- HQ staff
- Aerospace Group - equipped with 8 Mi-17, including 4 Mi-17-1W and 4 Sikorsky S-70i all helicopters are to be equipped with M134Gs
- Maintenance Group
- Isolated Personnel Recovery Team

== Gallery ==
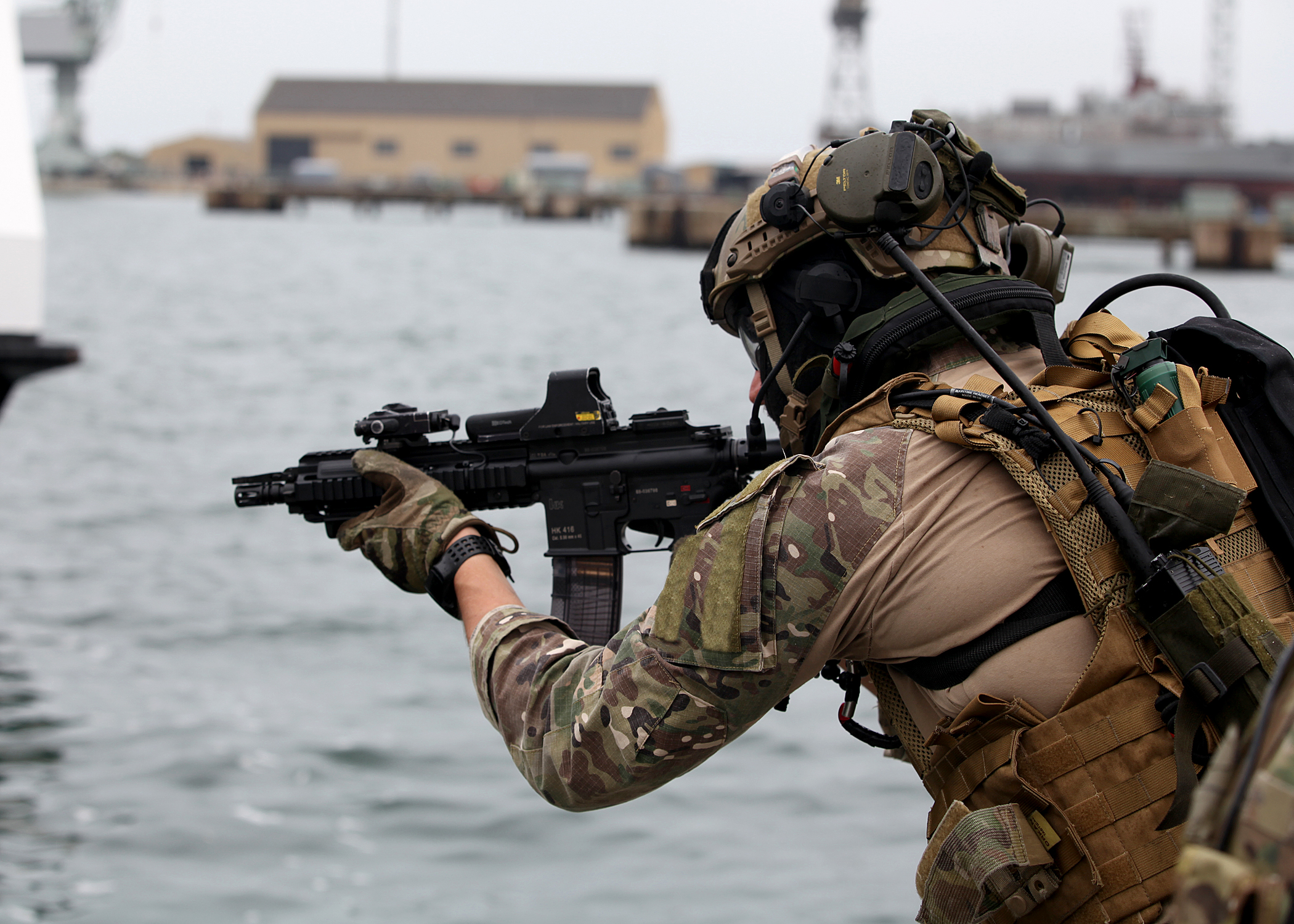
GROM operator conducting a port security exercise

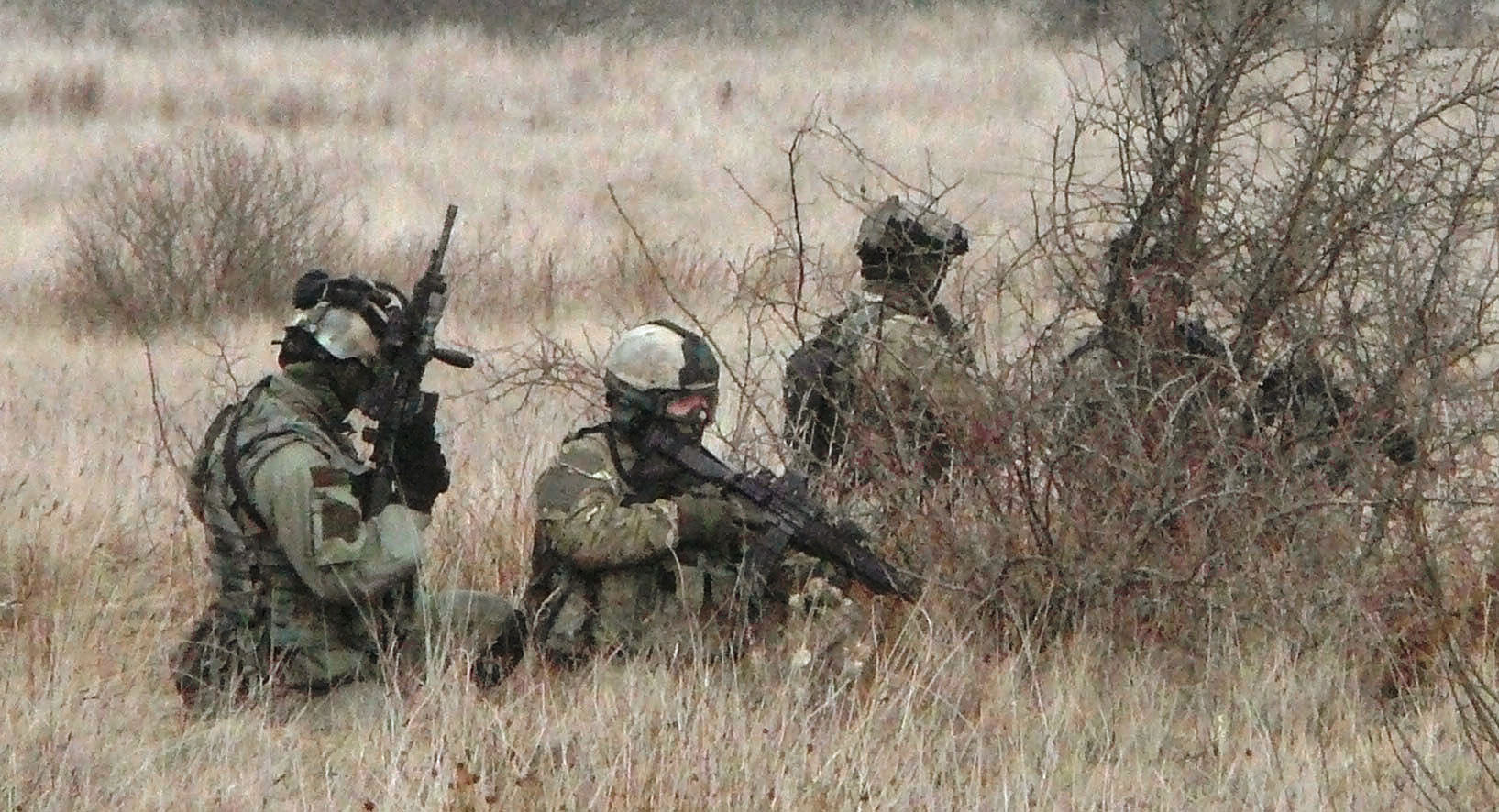
Polish GROM and US Navy SEALs conducting joint field exercises

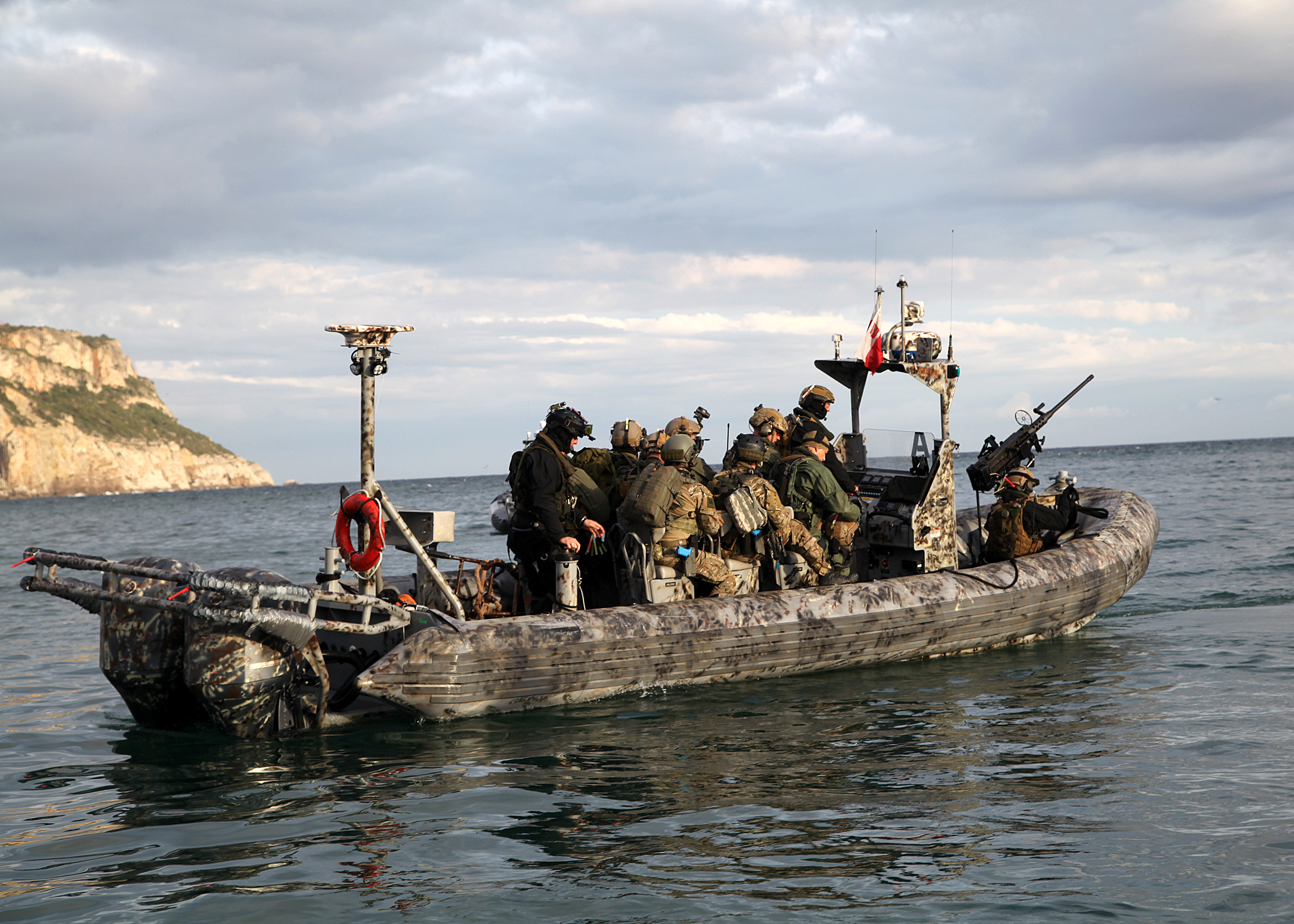
GROM unit conducting ship seizure training

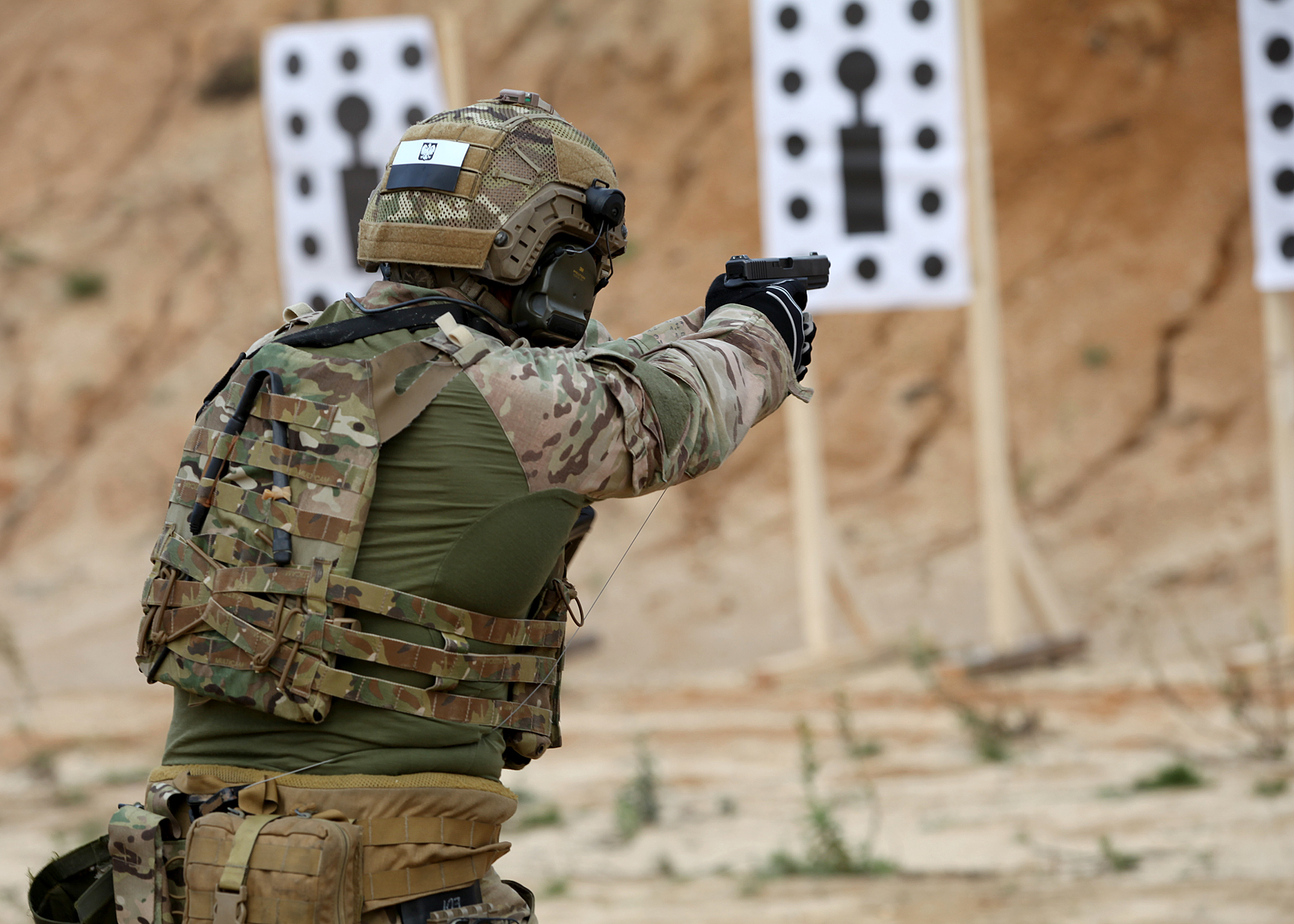
GROM operator conducting a pistol training exercise

== Equipment ==
=== Weaponry ===
Name	Type	Photo	Notes
Standard firearms of the Polish Armed Forces
Kbs wz. 1996 Beryl	Assault rifle		Most commonly used weapon
Pallad grenade launcher	Grenade launcher		Polish made grenade launcher, used from its introduction to the army
SWD	Sniper rifle		
Sako TRG	Sniper Rifle		
PKM	General purpose machine gun		
UKM-2000	General purpose machine gun		
Standard firearms of the Polish Special Forces
Heckler & Koch USP	Semi-auto pistol		Standard pistol in JW GROM, JW NIL and JW komandosów
Glock 17	Semi-auto pistol		Standard pistol in JW Komandosów, JW AGAT, JW NIL and JW GROM
SIG P226	Semi-auto pistol		Standard pistol in JW Formoza (Navy Unit)
FN Five-seven	Semi-auto pistol		Standard pistol for close protection in JW Grom
CZ Scorpion Evo 3	Submachine gun		New addition SMG for direct force operations in JW Grom
Heckler & Koch MP5	Submachine gun		Standard SMG for direct force operations in JW GROM, JW komandosów, JW Formoza and JW AGAT
FN P90	Submachine gun		Standard SMG for close protection in JW Grom
Colt M4A1	Assault rifle		Mostly supplanted the Beryl in JW GROM and JW NIL (M4A3)
Heckler & Koch HK416	Assault rifle		Assault rifle used by the Polish SOF, JW Grom, JW Komandosów, and JW Agat. Various barrel options used (10, 14.5 and 16.5 inch). Most commonly used assault rifle of the Special Forces
Heckler & Koch AG-C/GLM	Grenade launcher		Standard under-barrel grenade launcher used with the HK416
Heckler & Koch G36	Assault rifle		Used in JW Formoza and JW GROM
Heckler & Koch AG36	Grenade launcher		Standard grenade launcher used with the G36
FN Minimi	Light machine gun		Most common light machine gun in the Polish SOF
Carl Gustav	Recoilless rifle		
Other firearms
Beretta 92	Semi-auto pistol		
M4 Carbine	Assault rifle		Clones made by KAC and Bushmaster
F2000	Assault rifle		
M14 rifle	Battle rifle		Upgraded to EBR standard
M203	Grenade launcher		
H&K MZP-1	Grenade launcher		
Remington 870	Shotgun		
Heckler & Koch PSG-1	Sniper rifle		
Remington 700	Sniper rifle		
Mauser SP66	Sniper rifle		
Mauser 86	Sniper rifle		
Barrett M82	Anti-material rifle		

=== Vehicles ===
Name	Type	Variant	In service	Notes
HMMWV	Four-wheel drive multi-purpose vehicle	M1151A1 M1165A1	42 ?	In 2009, JW AGAT and JW Komandosów each received 15 M1151A1 vehicles. The remaining 12 vehicles, probably without Frag Kit armor but equipped with an advanced communication system, were delivered to JW GROM. Additionally, later the Special Forces Command decided to purchase an unspecified number of M1165A1 Special Ops, the so-called Ground Mobility Vehicle, i.e. a vehicle configured exclusively for the needs of special forces
Oshkosh M-ATV	MRAP	M1240A1	45	Donated by the United States.
Toyota	Four-wheel drive vehicle	Land Cruiser; Hilux		Used by GROM and 1 Pułk Specjalny Komandosów (1st Special Commando's Regiment)
Land Rover Defender	Four-wheel drive vehicle	90; 110	4; 6	Used by JW GROM and JW Formoza
Mercedes-Benz	Four-wheel drive vehicle Truck	G-class; Atego 1323AK	6; 10	The Polish Armed forces currently operate a total of 140 G-class vehicles. The Land forces operate 121 GD 290s and MB290GD WDs. The military police uses 13 GD 290s.
Tarpan Honker	4x4	Honker Skorpion 3 special version	Used by JW komandosów	Polish made off-road vehicles, best variants are powered with Polish Andoria engines
Defenture VECTOR	Four-wheel drive multi-purpose vehicle	Defenture GRF 4x4	2 option of ordering additional units	Purchased by Grom. Defenture GRF vehicles will join the fleet of the unit.
Star	Truck	Star 1444 (MAN TGM 18.280 BB)	1	Polish made trucks, now modernised to adjust to new weaponry and specifications
Volvo	Truck	Volvo FM 8x4 Volvo FM 6x6 Volvo FM 4x4	10; 11; 2	
Yamaha	Motorbike	Yamaha XT660	unknown	Used in JW NIL
Polaris	Quad	Polaris Sportsman 500 EFI	unknown	Used in all Polish SOF units
Range Rover	SUV	Range Rover Armoured	unknown	Used in Polish SOF Command

=== Aircraft ===
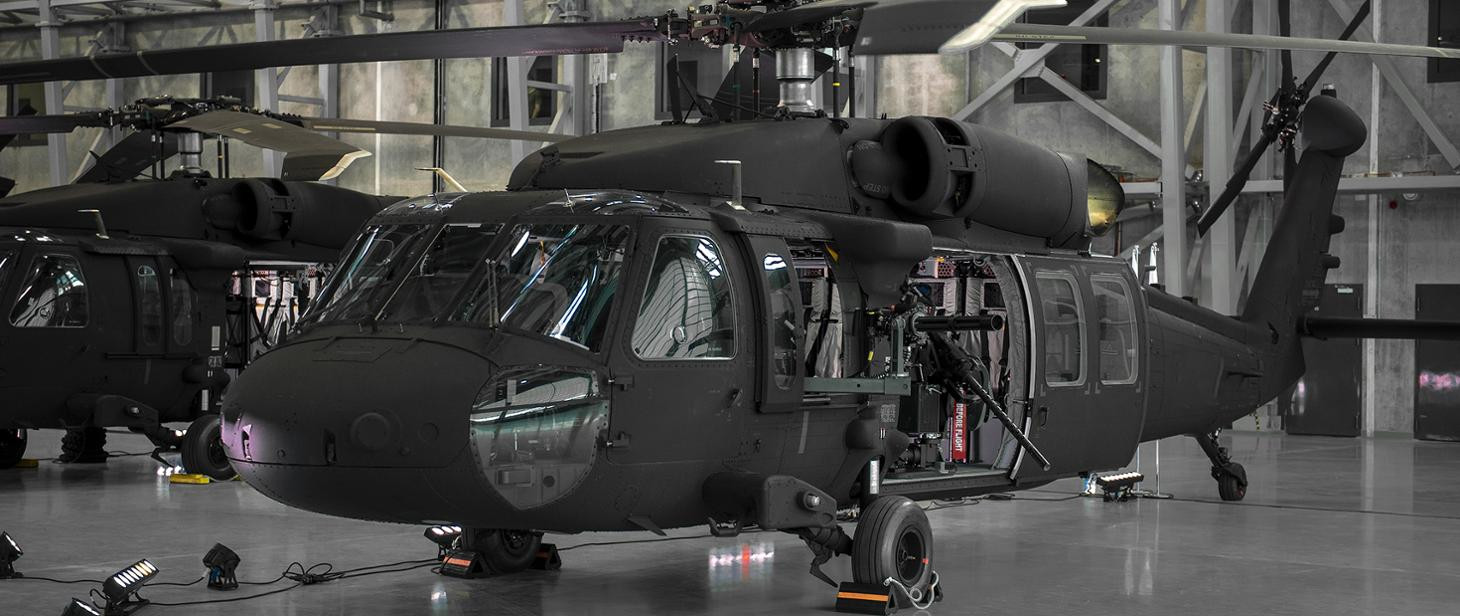
Polish SOF S-70i Black Hawk

Name	Type	Variant	In service	Notes
S-70i Black Hawk	Medium-lift transport/utility helicopter	S-70i	8	In 2019 7 S-70i Black Hawks were ordered and received. 4 to Special Forces and 3 to the Police.

=== Unmanned aerial vehicle ===
Name	Image	Type	In service	Notes
FlyEye		Small UAV	44	
RQ-21 Blackjack		Small UAV	10	
ScanEagle		Small UAV	10	As a result of the contract concluded in 2010 by the United States Department of Defense with Insitu, the Polish Army received one ScanEagle Block D UAV set free of charge, containing a ground system and 10 air platforms. Its user is the Jednostka Wojskowa NIL
Aeronautics Orbiter		Mini UAV	13	The first set of mini Aeronautics Orbiter class UAVs (4 flying devices) was purchased in October 2005 for the Jednostka Wojskowa GROM, the next three sets (3 flying devices each) were purchased in February 2007
Mayfly		Mikro UAV	24	
Black Hornet 3		Nano UAV	40 sets	

== Rank insignia ==
Officers

NATO Code	OF-9	OF-8	OF-7	OF-6	OF-5	OF-4	OF-3	OF-2	OF-1
Special Forces
Polish name	Generał^{1}	Generał broni	Generał dywizji	Generał brygady	Pułkownik	Podpułkownik	Major	Kapitan	Porucznik	Podporucznik
Abbreviation	gen.	gen. broni	gen. dyw.	gen. bryg.	płk	ppłk	mjr	kpt.	por.	ppor.
^{1} Until 2004 Generał armii

Enlisted

NATO Code	OR-9		OR-8	OR-7	OR-6	OR-5	OR-4		OR-3	OR-2	OR-1
Special Forces
Polish name	Starszy chorąży sztabowy	Starszy chorąży	Chorąży	Młodszy chorąży	Starszy sierżant	Sierżant	Plutonowy	Starszy kapral	Kapral	Starszy szeregowy	Szeregowy
Abbreviation	st. chor. szt.	st. chor.	chor.	mł. chor.	st. sierż.	sierż.	plut.	st. kpr.	kpr.	st. szer.	szer.

== See also ==
- Cichociemni
- Grupa Wawelberg
