= Agat Military Unit =

Jednostka Wojskowa Agat
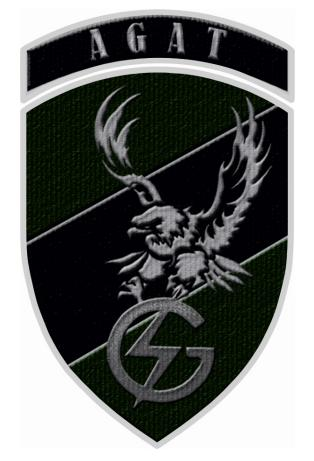
- Shoulder sleeve insignia
- Active: 18 March 2011 – present
- Country: Poland
- Branch: Special Troops Command
- Type: Special forces
- Garrison/HQ: Gliwice
- Nickname: AGAT
- Patron: Gen. Stefan Rowecki
- Mottos: Siła i Ogień! Za nami tylko zgliszcza! (Strength and Fire! Only cinders behind us!)
- Colors: Green, black

Insignia
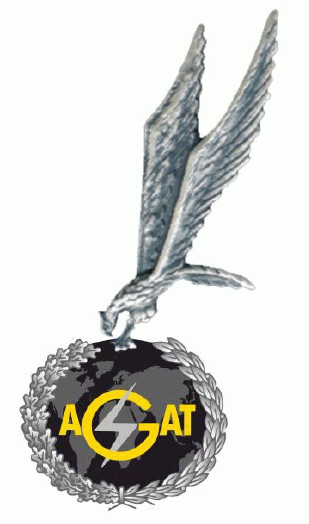
- Distinctive unit insignia (2012-2019)

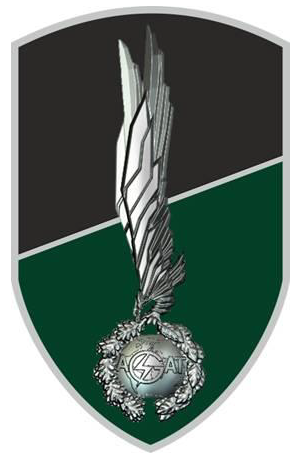
- Distinctive unit insignia (since 2019)

Jednostka Wojskowa AGAT is a Special Forces unit of the Polish Armed Forces. A relatively new unit, its name is shortened for “anti-gestapo” in honor of a WWII Polish Home Army Combat Diversion unit. As an advanced infantry unit, its role is comparable to that of the 75th Ranger Regiment.

== History ==
This unit was formed on the basis of the Special Branch of the Military Police in Gliwice, taking over its barracks complex and part the staff, the date of formation of the basic units of the unit was designated for June 30, 2011, so that the unit could from 1 July 2011 onward begin its role as a functioning unit within the Special Troops Command.

The unit is an airborne formation and is tasked with securing and supporting operations of the Special Forces. The unit is also to carry out offensive tasks aimed at slowing down enemy forces, subversive operations and operations behind enemy lines. In order for the unit to be equal to the best special units in the country and in the world, it participates in exercises with special units of other NATO countries - and most often with US soldiers. In comparison to the other STC units, AGAT is fitted out with heavy weapons such as heavy machine guns and anti-tank rocket launchers.

JW AGAT's members attend Ranger School, but due to financial problems and lack of more free slots in Ranger School, as all trainings and schools connected with SOF are so busy that it is necessary to wait for a free slot, even for US military staff, it was reported that the DWS together with JW AGAT were negotiating a deal for the arrival of some Rangers, about 8-10 trainers, to Poland to lead the training.

== Structure ==
The unit is made up of three Assault Groups (Polish:Grup Szturmowych) and support elements. It was planned that by the end of 2012 combat capability would be reached by Assault Group "A", subsequent Teams were to have the following deadlines for combat capability - Group "B" initial readiness in 2013 and total in 2015, Group "C" was expected to achieve total combat capability by 2016. Current subunits include:

- HQ Staff and Command Group
- Assault Group A
- Assault Group B
- Assault Group C
- Combat Support Team
- Logistics Security Team
- Medical Security Group

== Commanders ==
- Colonel Sławomir Berdychowski (2011 - 13.X.2014)
- Colonel Sławomir Drumowicz (13.X.2014 - 8.X.2018)
- Colonel Artur Kozłowski (8.X.2018–present)

== See also ==
- 75th Ranger Regiment - US army equivalent unit
- Special Forces Support Group - British army equivalent unit
- 31st Ranger Battalion - Swedish Army equivalent unit
