= Powidz, Greater Poland Voivodeship =

Powidz
- Village
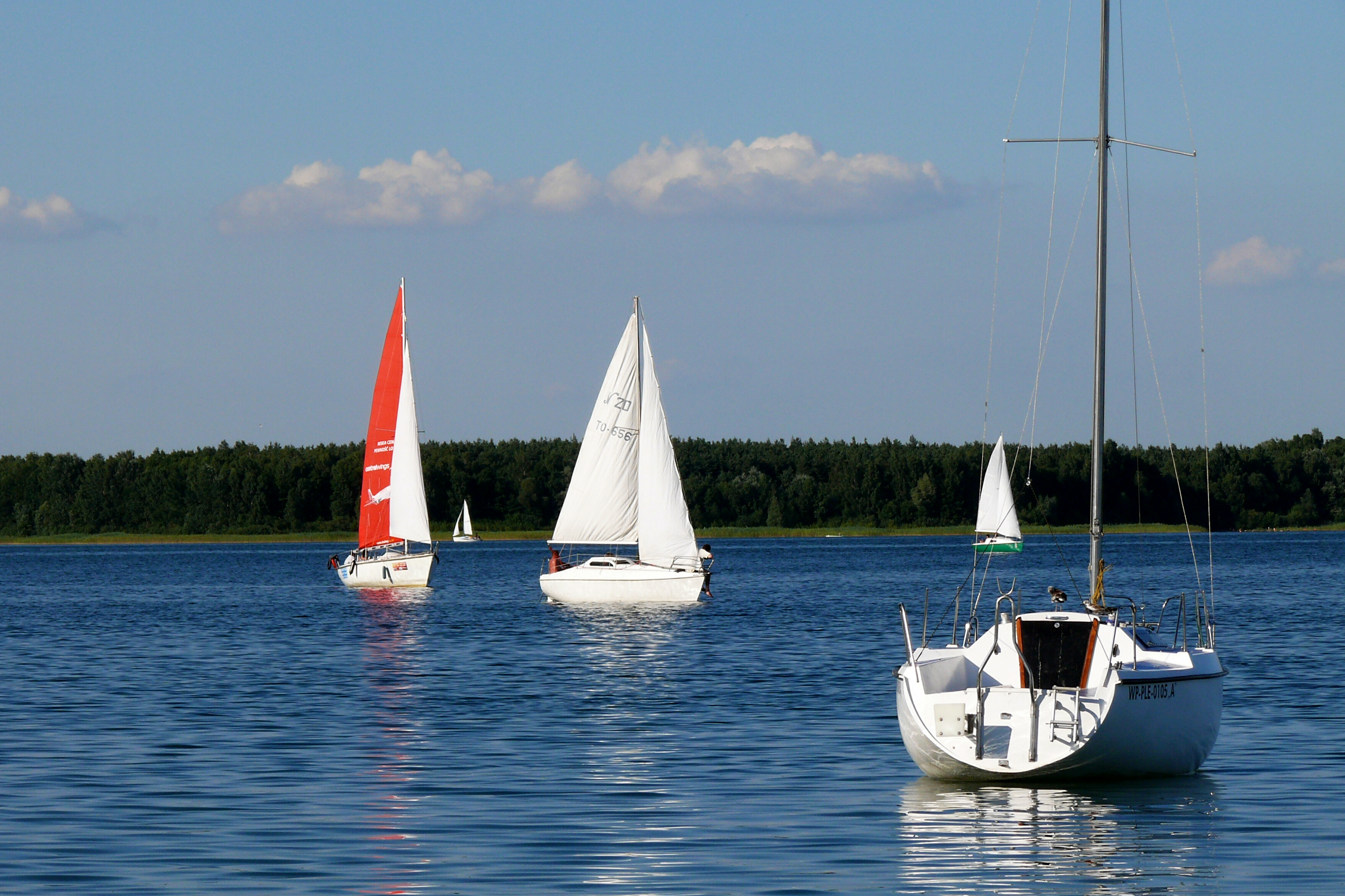
- Niedzięgiel Lake

- Coat of arms

- Location within Poland
- Coordinates: 52°25′N 17°55′E
- Country: Poland
- Voivodeship: Greater Poland
- County: Słupca
- Gmina: Powidz
- Population: 1,000
- Time zone: UTC+1 (CET)
  - Summer (DST): UTC+2 (CEST)
- Website: http://www.powidz.pl

Powidz (pronounced Povitz [ˈpɔvit͡s]) is a village in Słupca County, Greater Poland Voivodeship, in west-central Poland. It is the seat of the gmina (administrative district) called Gmina Powidz.

Powidz gives its name to the protected area called Powidz Landscape Park.

From the summer of 2019, Powidz’ nearby 33rd Air Base will be the site of a depot and storage site for US Army combat vehicles in Poland. It will be mostly funded by NATO’s Security Investment Program, and cost around US$210m, with the USA’s component capped at around 20-25%. The US Army Corps of Engineers has made an industry solicitation in 2018 requesting tree-cutting services for 38 hectares (94 acres) around the base.

== History ==
Powidz was granted town rights in 1243 by Duke Bolesław the Pious. It was then part of the Duchy of Greater Poland of fragmented Piast-ruled Poland. Powidz was a royal town of the Polish Crown, administratively located in the Gniezno County in the Kalisz Voivodeship in the Greater Poland Province. The town repelled Teutonic attacks in 1331 and 1454, and received numerous privileges from Polish kings. From the 15th century, Powidz was the seat of local starosts. In the 15th century, a school was created in Powidz, which was subordinate to the Kraków Academy (present-day Jagiellonian University), the oldest and leading university of Poland. The town suffered in the 17th century as a result of the epidemic and the Swedish invasion.

In 1793, as a result of the Second Partition of Poland, it was annexed by Prussia. After the successful Greater Poland uprising of 1806, it was regained by Poles and included with the short-lived Duchy of Warsaw, and in 1815 it was re-annexed by Prussia. Many residents took part in the Kościuszko Uprising (1794), November Uprising (1830), Greater Poland uprising (1848) and January Uprising (1863), and actively opposed Germanisation attempts. In 1918 local Poles joined the Greater Poland uprising (1918–19), in a successful attempt to re-join Poland, which just regained independence.

During World War II, Powidz was under German occupation from 1939 to 1945. In late 1939 the Germans expelled 80 Poles, farm owners and activists along with their families, to the so-called General Government in the more eastern part of German-occupied Poland, and their houses were handed over to German colonists as part of the Heim ins Reich policy. The Polish resistance was active in Powidz. Józef Izbiński, commander of the local unit of the Union of Armed Struggle, and Ludwik Gruszka and Bolesław Purek, co-founders of the local unit of the Grey Ranks, were arrested by the Germans in 1942 and then sentenced to death and executed in Rawicz the following year.

A Polish Air Force base was built in Powidz after 1953.

== Notable people ==
- Edward Dorszewski, Polish military officer, victim of the Katyn massacre
- Jan Kanty Szwedkowski, Polish painter
- Damazy Zielewicz, Polish military officer during the January Uprising, Franciscan
