= Commandos Military Unit =

Polish special operations unit

Army Commandos
- Jednostka Wojskowa Komandosów
- Shoulder sleeve insignia as of 2014
- Active: 1961 – present
- Country: Poland
- Branch: Special Troops Command
- Type: Special Forces
- Role: Special Operations
- Garrison/HQ: Lubliniec
- Nickname: JWK
- Mottos: Cisi i skuteczni [or Latin translation Secreti ac Efficaces] (Silent and Effective)
- Colors: Red, Black
- Engagements: Kosovo Conflict; Iraq War; War in Afghanistan (2001–2021)
- Website: https://jwk.wp.mil.pl

Commanders
- Commander: płk Michał Strzelecki

Insignia
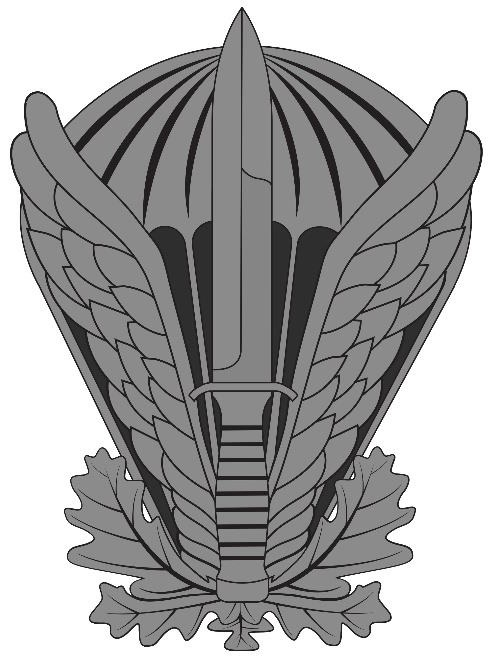
- Distinctive unit insignia (since 2020)

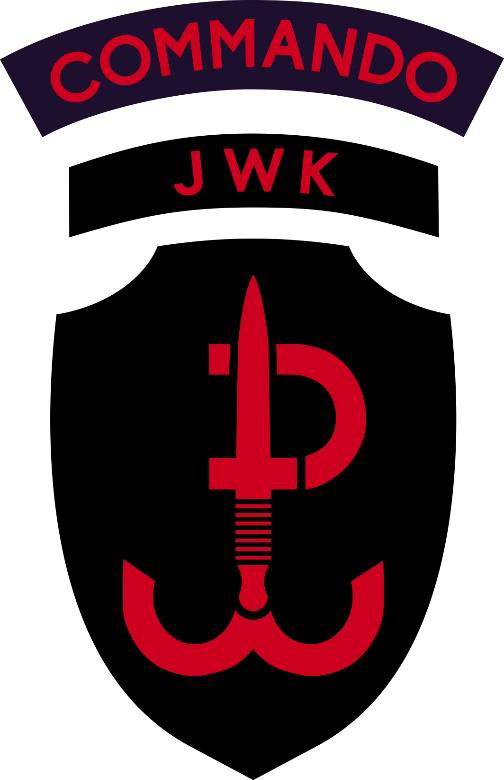
- Special COMMANDO shoulder sleeve insignia

The Jednostka Wojskowa Komandosów, commonly called JWK and formerly known as 1 Pułk Specjalny Komandosów (1 PSK), is one of six special forces units currently operating within Poland's Centrum Operacji Specjalnych - Dowództwo Komponentu Wojsk Specjalnych (COS - DKWS, en. Special Operations Center - Special Forces Component Command). JWK (although under different name and with different structure) was formed in 1961 and is the oldest still active Polish special operations unit. The unit is located in Lubliniec, Poland.

The regiment has carried out the majority of special operations that have resulted in the gathering of actual Polish Intelligence. In the early years of the global war on terrorism, The regiment carried out special operations alongside US Navy SEALs from the Naval Special Warfare Development Group also known as SEAL Team Six.

== Mission ==
The unit's soldiers usually display a very high level of skills due to rigorous training and are trained to undertake a wide range of special missions during war, crisis and peace time.

Unit performs the following tasks:

- SR - (Special Reconnaissance) - timely and accurate intelligence gathering on an enemy and its operations and strategies
- UW - (Unconventional Warfare) - support and guerrilla training, spread of subversion and propaganda
- DA - (Direct action (military)) - sabotage, ambushes, raids
- PR - (Personnel Recovery) - recovery of missing or abducted friendly personnel from areas of operations
- CSAR - (Combat Search and Rescue) - combat rescue and reconnaissance
- CT - (Counter-Terrorism) - capture or killing of known terrorists, seizing or destruction of terrorist assets
- CP - (Counter-Proliferation) - combat the proliferation of Weapons of Mass Destruction and conventional weapons
- MS - (Military Support) - support, training and advising of allied forces
- FID - (Foreign Internal Defense) - counter-insurgency in a foreign state
- MOOTW - (Military Operations Other Than War) - Crisis Response operations
- HR - (Hostage Rescue) - release of civilians or prisoners of war from an enemy or criminals
- CPP - (Close Personal Protection) - personal protection of VIP, notably head of state and ambassadors

Along with being trained and competent in urban warfare, underwater warfare and mountain warfare, JWK personnel are able to carry out operations by land, air (including HALO and HAHO operations) or sea. In addition, JWK also possesses JTAC-qualified personnel.

It is worth noting that out of the 1800 worldwide, in JWK currently serve the only Polish soldiers who have ever graduated from the grueling U.S. Special Operations Combat Medic Course (SOCM) at the U.S. Army John F. Kennedy Special Warfare Center and School at Fort Bragg, North Carolina.

== History ==
The unit was established in 1961 as a part of 6th Pomeranian Airborne Division in Kraków, under the name 26 Batalion Dywersyjno – Rozpoznawczy (en. 26th Sabotage-Reconnaissance Battalion). In 1964 26th S-RB was detached from 6th Airborne Division and relocated to Dziwnów on Wolin Island (Baltic Sea). It was restructured and named 1 Samodzielny Batalion Szturmowy (en. 1st Detached Assault Battalion).

On October 8, 1993, following an executive order from the Chief of the General Staff of the Polish Armed Forces, the unit was relocated to Lubliniec and transitioned from a battalion to a regiment, which led to its renaming to 1 Pułk Specjalny (en. 1st Special Regiment) before being changed to 1 Pułk Specjalny Komandosów (en. 1st Special Commando Regiment) in 1995. Even though the unit's name did not receive its "Commando" (Komandosów) moniker until 1995, it officially became a Special Operations Forces unit of the Polish Armed Forces following the 1993 executive order; making at the time 1 Pułk Specjalny the only unit subordinated to the command of the Land Forces branch of the Polish Army while at the same time operating as a Special Forces unit.

After twelve years under the command of the Polish Land Forces, the unit transitioned to the Polish Special Forces Command (pl. Dowództwo Wojsk Specjalnych) along with all other Polish Special Forces units when it was formed in 2007.

Finally in 2011 (October 1) for its 50th anniversary, the unit was renamed Jednostka Wojskowa Komandosów which at present is its current name. Within Poland's Armed Forces organization, the unit is referred to by its code number JW4101.

== Organization ==
JWK is currently operating under the command of płk (Col.) Wiesław Kukuła. The unit operates with a combat structure similar to the US Army Special Forces and the Australian 2nd Commando Regiment and is composed of four squadrons with a fourth set up by 2016; respectively ZB A, ZB B, ZB C and ZB D.

Each of these teams carry the traditions of Polish units from World War II. ZB A inherits its traditions from Polski Samodzielny Batalion Specjalny and Batalion Miotła, ZB B inherits theirs from the No. 6 Troop (Polish) of the No. 10 (Inter-Allied) Commando and ZB C inherits theirs from Batalion Parasol. It should also be noted that the headquarters detachment of the military unit also preserves traditions from World War II, which are those of Batalion Zośka from the Polish Home Army resistance movement.

Current Structure:

- HQ & Logistics Detachment
- Squadron A - insignia of the Batalion Miotła from the Polish Home Army and insignia of PSBS
- Squadron B - Combined Operations insignia of the No. 10 (Inter-Allied) Commando unit and its No. 6 Troop (Polish)
- Squadron C - insignia of the Batalion Parasol from the Polish Home Army
- Squadron D - set up in 2016
- Command and Security Unit - insignia of the Batalion Zośka from the Polish Home Army
- Information Support Group
- Special Forces Training Center

All three combat detachments as well as the HQ & Logistics Detachment have their own insignias, all carrying on Poland's legacy from World War II.

JWK insignias

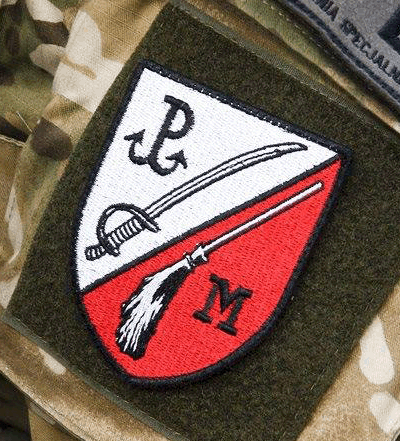
Zespół Bojowy A, Miotła insignia

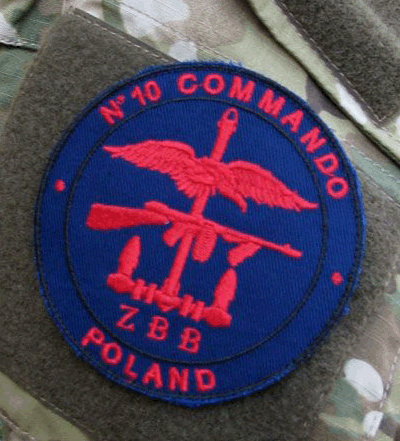
Zespół Bojowy B, Combined Operations insignia

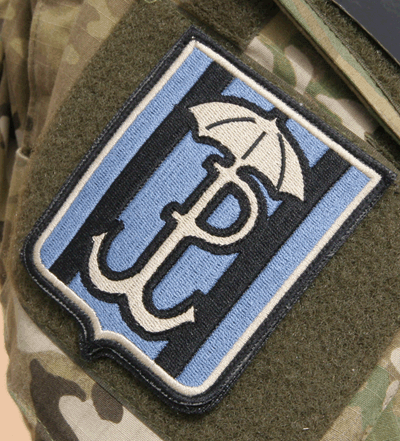
Zespół Bojowy C, Parasol insignia

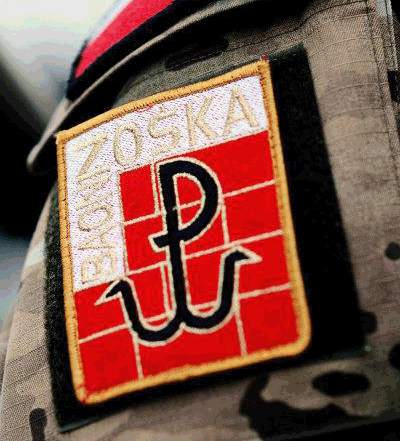
Pododdział wsparcia i zabezpieczenia, Zośka insignia

Along with all other Wojska Specjalne units, JWK is currently subordinated to the Centrum Operacji Specjalnych - Dowództwo Komponentu Wojsk Specjalnych (COS-DKWS, en. Special Operations Center - Special Forces Component Command); which itself is subordinated to the Armed Forces Branches Operational Command (Pol. Dowództwo Operacyjne Rodzajów Sił Zbrojnych) and Armed Forces Branches General Command's Inspectorate of Wojska Specjalne (Pol. Dowództwo Generalne Rodzajów Sił Zbrojnych), (Pol. Inspektorat Wojsk Specjalnych). Before Komorowski & Koziej reform (structure till 31.12.2013) from Biuro Bezpieczeństwa Narodowego, Wojska Specjalne had simply organisation of commanding (force user & force provider) - Dowództwo Wojsk Specjalnych.

=== Unit insignia ===
Continuing with its tradition of honoring and remembering Poland's legacy from World War II, JWK unveiled its new insignia on December 30, 2013 with the formal debut being January 1, 2014. The unit described it as a "combination of tradition and modernity", with the insignia referring to the legacy of the Polish Home Army, while at the same time bringing in modernity by incorporating the distinctive symbols of partisan & commando forces.

The anchor, known as Kotwica, refers to the "Poland Fighting" symbol of the Polish resistance movement from World War II, which was present on the insignia of Batalion Miotła (current insignia of JWK's Squadron A), Batalion Parasol (current insignia of JWK's Squadron C) and Batalion Zośka (current insignia of JWK's Sub-Command and Security element); the three reconnaissance battalions from the Polish Home Army.

Incorporated in the "Kotwica" anchor is a dagger, a symbol of special operations forces and also a nod to the unit's previous insignias both as 1PSK and as JWK.

The red color of the emblem refers to the color of No. 10 (Inter-Allied) Commando unit from World War II and its No. 6 Polish Troop also known as the 1st Independent Company, whose Combined Operations recognition badge serves as the current insignia for JWK's Squadron B. The black background of the unit's insignia is a nod to the official color of the Polish Special Forces.

== Recruitment ==
Candidates wanting to serve in the Regiment must first successfully undertake a basic military training course. They then move on to a three-month "Junior Specialist" training course. During this phase recruits receive training in close combat, hand to hand combat, fighting with specialised equipment, parachuting, land navigation, weapons handling, basic survival, and several other military-related skills. Troops who successfully complete the second phase then move onto the unit, where they are assigned to a Battle Team (Zespół Bojowy). Once there, additional training continues (mountain and cold weather training, sniper, Casevac, amphibious operations, etc.). Volunteering soldiers from the unit can receive advanced training in allied countries, most notably the U.S. Army Ranger course.

== Recent operations ==
The regiment has been quite active in recent years. In 2003, troops were deployed to support NATO operations in the Republic of Macedonia during the Kosovo conflict; a 13-man detachment was deployed to Afghanistan as part of Polish support for Operation Enduring Freedom (OEF). In 2006, they were in charge of protecting the Polski Kontyngent Wojskowy (Polish Military Contingent) in Pakistan which helped in technical rescue after the Pakistan earthquake.

Squadron B of JWK was deployed to Iraq (Iraq War) as part of the Multinational Division Central-South in Diwaniyah. Headquartered in Camp Echo under Polish command.

Squadron B of JWK were involved in combat operations throughout Afghanistan, including the Kandahar Province.

In 2007 reports of war crimes from JWK soldiers started to become public. In August of 2007, a Polish patrol attacked the village of Nangar Khel, killing six civilians, including three children, and wounding three others.

Squadron B was deployed to Iraq (Iraq War) as part of the Multinational Division Central-South in Diwaniyah. Soldiers fought together with the 5th SFG ODA and were fighting and leading special operations throughout Afghanistan, including the Kandahar Province. Since 2010 Squadron B of JWK compound formed ISAF SOF Task Force 50 which perform special operations like capturing JPEL's, Special Reconnaissance, FID. TF-50 soldiers are operating in Ghazni Province and Paktika (War in Afghanistan). In 2016, JW Komandosów was tasked with training the elite Ukrainian 1st Battalion, 79th Airborne-Assault Brigade, whose soldiers were nicknamed Cyborgs for their famous defense of Donetsk airport in 2014.

== Uniform ==
Like all units subordinated to COS-DKWS, JWK personnel wear a MultiCam or Suez (Poland's own version of MultiCam developed around 2007, no longer issued and currently being phased out) uniform while in garrison. For various reasons, they may also wear civilian clothing. Soldiers may also wear a distinctive dark green beret with a badge depicting the Eagle of the Polish Special Forces, though it is not mandatory except for a formal ceremony or with the dress uniform. Apart from Command personnel, all other personnel wear uniforms and berets that bear no name or rank so as to conceal and protect their identities. Civilian haircuts and facial hairs are authorized to help soldiers blend-in with the rest of the population. Every soldier serving in a combat capacity within the unit has a nickname used to refer to them when in a public environment.

== Weapons ==
Weapons in use within JWK as of mid-2015.

=== Assault rifle ===
- Heckler & Koch HK416 in 14.5" version
- Heckler & Koch HK416 A5 in 11" version (currently being deployed)
- Beryl

=== Pistols ===
- Heckler & Koch HK USP SD in 9×19mm
- Heckler & Koch HK USP in 9×19mm
- GLOCK 17 Gen3 in 9×19mm

=== Submachine guns ===
- Heckler & Koch MP5
- Heckler & Koch MP5SD
- Heckler & Koch MP5K-PDW
- PM-98 Glauberyt

=== Shotgun ===
- Mossberg 500

=== Sniper rifles ===
- SAKO TRG-22
- Barrett M107
- Accuracy International AWM
- Accuracy International AXMC
- Knight's Armament Company M110

=== Machine gun ===
- FN Herstal FN MINIMI in 5.56mm NATO and 7.62mm NATO
- FN M2HB

=== RPG ===
- Carl-Gustaf M3

=== Grenade launcher ===
- Heckler & Koch HK GLM/AG-HK416
- M320 GLM

=== 40mm grenade launcher system ===
- Heckler & Koch GMG

=== Unmanned aerial vehicle ===
- Aeronautics Defense Orbiter Mini UAV System

== Unit Commanders since 1993 ==
- ppłk dypl. Zbigniew Kwintal 1993 - 19.7.1999
- ppłk dypl. Bogdan Kołtuński 19.7.1999 - 24.2.2003
- ppłk dypl. Wojciech Jania 24.2.2003 - 15.9.2005
- płk Piotr Patalong 15.9.2005 - 7.11.2006
- płk Dariusz Dachowicz 7.11.2006 - 16.2.2010
- płk Ryszard Pietras 16.2.2010 - 5.9.2012
- ppłk Sławomir Drumowicz 5.9.2012 - 26.11.2012
- płk Wiesław Kukuła 26.11.2012–28.10.2016
- płk Michał Strzelecki 28.10.2016–14.05.2021
- płk Wojciech Danisiewicz 14.05.2021–11.12.2023
- płk Marcin Suszko 11.12.2023–present

== Losses ==
Since its inception the unit has lost eleven members as a result of active military duty.

- sierż. Piotr Łosiak (February 16, 1995)
- st. szer. Tomasz Przybylski (March 14, 1998)
- kpt. Paweł Urlik (December 9, 1998)
- plut. Artur Kuchta (September 11, 1999)
- mjr Stanisław Musiejuk (October 29, 2002)
- sierż. Piotr Mikułowski (March 4, 2003)
- sierż. Paweł Legencki (March 4, 2003)
- sierż. Sebastian Gruszka (September 20, 2009)
- mł. chor. Bartosz Spychała (April 3, 2011)
- mł. chor. szt. Arkadiusz Horbiński (May 8, 2011)
- st. chor. szt. Mirosław Łucki (August 24, 2013)

== Sources ==
- http://www.wojskaspecjalne.mil.pl
