= Starina =

Starina may refer to:

- Starina, Stará Ľubovňa District, a village in Stará Ľubovňa District, Slovakia
- Starina, Snina District, a village in Snina District, Slovakia
- Starina reservoir, an artificial lake in Snina District, Slovakia
- Starina, Zenica, village in Zenica municipality, Bosnia and Herzegovina
