= Łączki =

Łączki may refer to the following places:

- Łączki, Kuyavian-Pomeranian Voivodeship (north-central Poland)
- Łączki, Lesko County in Subcarpathian Voivodeship (south-east Poland)
- Łączki, Przemyśl County in Subcarpathian Voivodeship (south-east Poland)
- Łączki, Masovian Voivodeship (east-central Poland)
- Łączki, Silesian Voivodeship (south Poland)
- Łączki, Pomeranian Voivodeship (north Poland)
- Łączki, Warmian-Masurian Voivodeship (north Poland)
