= Smolnik =

Smolnik may refer to the following places:

== Bulgaria ==
- Smolnik, Bulgaria, a village in Karnobat Municipality, Burgas Province

== Slovakia ==
- Smolník, Gelnica District, a village and municipality in the Košice Region
- Smolník, Snina District, a former village in the Prešov Region

== Slovenia ==
- Smolnik, Ruše, a dispersed settlement in the Styria region
- Smolnik, Dobrova–Polhov Gradec, a dispersed settlement in the Upper Carniola region

== Poland ==
- Smolnik, Lower Silesian Voivodeship (south-west Poland)
- Smolnik, Bieszczady County in Subcarpathian Voivodeship (south-east Poland)
- Smolnik, Sanok County in Subcarpathian Voivodeship (south-east Poland)
- Smolnik, Greater Poland Voivodeship (west-central Poland)
- Smolnik, Warmian-Masurian Voivodeship (north Poland)
- Smólnik, Kuyavian-Pomeranian Voivodeship (north-central Poland)
