= Dębice =

Dębice may refer to:

- Dębice, Lower Silesian Voivodeship (south-west Poland)
- Dębice, Kuyavian-Pomeranian Voivodeship (north-central Poland)
- Dębice, Greater Poland Voivodeship (west-central Poland)
- Dębice, West Pomeranian Voivodeship (north-west Poland)
- Kolonia Dębice

== See also ==
- Dębica
