= Video tolling =

Form of electronic toll collection

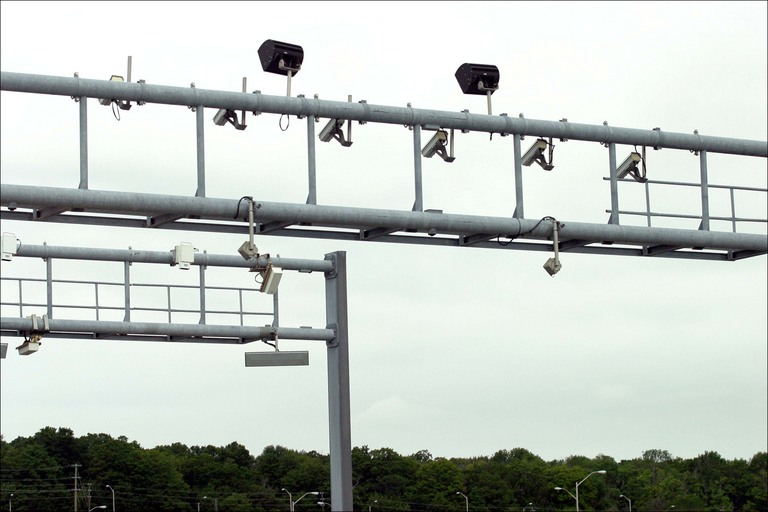
Highway 407 in the Greater Toronto Area, Canada

Video tolling (sometimes referred to as video billing, toll by plate, pay by mail, or pay by plate) is a form of electronic toll collection that uses video or still images of a vehicle's license plate to identify a vehicle liable to pay a road toll. The system dispenses with collection of road tolls using road-side cash or payment card methods, and may be used in conjunction with "all electronic" open road tolling, to permit drivers without an RFID device (often referred to as a "Tag") to use the toll road.

== Technology ==
In a video tolling system the license plate number can be extracted from an image either by using automatic number plate recognition (ANPR) technology or manual data-entry clerks.

Video tolling is sometimes used in conjunction with "all electronic" open road tolling, to allow drivers without an RFID device (often referred to as a "Tag") to use the toll road. An all electronic system is a toll collection point that does not permit cash payment, and vehicle identification / toll collection is done using RFID or other electronic means. When video tolling is used in conjunction with all electronic systems, a fee is frequently added to the toll to offset the higher cost of processing video tolls.

There are two forms of video billing: "registered" and "unregistered" accounts. In registered video billing, the motorist first registers the vehicle's plates with the tolling agency prior to using the toll road. The toll system will then associate the plate images with the account and debit the amount of the toll from the account.

Unregistered systems look up the vehicle registration information from a government motor vehicle registration database and send a bill to the address in the database. There may be an extra charge for the additional processing.

== North America ==
The first video tolling system in North America was the Highway 407 in the Greater Toronto Area. The 407 ETR system, which opened in 1997, has struggled somewhat with accuracy and customer service issues, and on 2003, settled a lawsuit related to potential incorrect charges on the system. Video Tolling systems are also being evaluated in the United States, and in 2006, the Texas Department of Transportation (TxDOT) deployed the first "Video Only" system on SH 121 north of Dallas, but not without some controversy with Cintra attempting to gain control and construction of the SH 121 Tollway; maintenance of the SH 121 Tollway was transferred to the North Texas Tollway Authority (NTTA) in 2008 and was redesignated as the Sam Rayburn Tollway.

=== California ===
Video tolling is used as a secondary enforcement measure for vehicles not equipped with a FasTrak RFID transponder on the toll roads, toll bridges, and high-occupancy toll lanes throughout California. When a vehicle does not have a transponder, or if a transponder is not detected at enforcement points, a violation enforcement system triggers a camera system that captures photos of the vehicle and its license plate for processing.

=== Pennsylvania ===
The Pennsylvania Turnpike has fully converted to cashless toll collection across its entire network. Drivers without an E-ZPass transponder are billed through a plate-imaging program that photographs license plates at toll points and mails invoices to the vehicle's registered owner. This system has operated in its current form since 2020.

== Europe ==
The approach to and passing of the northbound Videomaut lane at Schönberg toll station on the A13 motorway in Austria

=== Austria ===
In Austria works system called ASFINAG (Autobahnen-und-Schnellstraßen-Finanzierungs-Aktiengesellschaft), the Austrian financing provider for and operator of motorways (Autobahnen) and expressways (Schnellstraßen) uses a video tolling system called Videomaut (Video Toll). It covers parts of three motorways which are subject to special tolls (Sondermaut) in addition to the regular tolls paid through a road-tax disc (Vignette) for vehicles with a total weight of no more than 3.5 metric tonnes.

==== Availability ====
Videomaut is available on the following routes:

- A9 Pyhrn Motorway (Pyhrnautobahn), between Spital/Pyhrn and Ardning and between St. Michael and Übelbach, toll plaza of Bosruck
- A10 Tauern Motorway (Tauernautobahn), between Flachau and Rennweg, toll plaza of St. Michael i.L.
- A13 Brenner Motorway (Brennerautobahn), between Brenner Pass and Schönberg, toll plaza of Schönberg

==== Use and limitations ====
To use Videomaut, the user must buy a Videomaut ticket, either online or in person at an ASFINAG customer service centre or authorised point of sale. The route, number of travels, and the number plate of the car to be used must be specified. A Videomaut ticket is valid for one year from the date it is issued. When approaching a toll plaza, the user must enter the lane marked Videomaut and travel no faster than 15 km/h. The car's number plate is read and identified automatically, and the vehicle is allowed to pass. If the number plate cannot be read, or no valid Videomaut ticket is associated with the number plate, the user is directed into a regular toll lane and must show a copy of the receipt for the Videomaut ticket as proof of purchase to the toll cashier. The toll cashier verifies the validity of the ticket and allows the vehicle to continue or directs the driver to pay the special toll incurred if the ticket is invalid or has expired. Videomaut is available only to cars without a trailer which do not exceed a width of 2.3 metres and a total weight of 3.5 metric tonnes.

==== Fees and discounts ====
Videomaut tickets can be bought for a single or multiple passages or an unlimited number of passages for one year from the date the ticket is issued. Discounts are available to:

- drivers holding road-tax discs that are valid for one year,
- commuters,
- military and alternative civilian service members, and
- drivers with disabilities.

=== Poland ===
In Poland system called A4Go and AmberGo is available on two parts of highways: A4 on the section between Krakow and Katowice and on A1 on the section between Rusocin and Nowa Wieś. Payment is a possible via few mobile applications for IOS and Android: Autopay, Skycash, AmberGo, A4Go.

== Australia ==
In Australia, video tolling is a part of the e-TAG system, and is country-wide. The e-TAG system originated in the 1990s when Melbourne's CityLink, operated by Transurban, became the first tollway in the Southern Hemisphere to operate without traditional toll booths.
