= Kosinowo =

Kosinowo may refer to the following places in Poland:

- Kosinowo, Lower Silesian Voivodeship (south-west Poland)
- Kosinowo, Kuyavian-Pomeranian Voivodeship (north-central Poland)
- Kosinowo, Warmian-Masurian Voivodeship (north Poland)
