= Kobieta na krańcu świata =

Polish documentary television series

- Created by: Martyna Wojciechowska; Małgorzata Łupina
- Directed by: Małgorzata Łupina
- Presented by: Martyna Wojciechowska
- Country of origin: Poland
- No. of series: 11
- No. of episodes: 93

Production
- Producer: Małgorzata Łupina
- Running time: 30 minutes

Original release
- Network: TVN
- Release: 20 September 2009 – present

Kobieta na krańcu świata (Woman At the End Of the World) is a Polish documentary television series broadcast on TVN. The programme is presented by Martyna Wojciechowska who visits interesting places all over the world and shows the everyday life of women living there. It premiered on 20 September 2009.

== List of episodes ==
=== Series 1 (2009) ===
#	#	Original air date	Visited country	Polish title	English title	Audience
1	1	20 September 2009	Venezuela	Przepis na miss	Beauty Cult in Venezuela	1 244 655
2	2	27 September 2009	Cambodia	Kobieta saper	Mine-clearing Engineer in Cambodia	1 001 960
3	3	4 October 2009	Kenya	Sierociniec dla słoni	Elephant Orphanage in Kenya	1 539 681
4	4	11 October 2009	Bolivia	Zapaśniczka (część 1)	Women Wrestlers in Bolivia (Part 1)	1 432 708
5	5	18 October 2009	Bolivia	Zapaśniczka (część 2)	Women Wrestlers in Bolivia (Part 2)	1 683 563
6	6	25 October 2009	Namibia	Wesele Himba	Nomadic Lifestyle in Namibia	1 779 159
7	7	1 November 2009	Argentina	Kobieta kowboj	Woman-cowboy in Argentina	1 274 344
8	8	8 November 2009	Zanzibar	Jeden mąż i dwie żony	One husband – two wives on Zanzibar	1 594 302
9	9	15 November 2009	Vietnam	Życie na wodzie	A family who lives “on the water” in Vietnam	2 089 338
10	10	22 November 2009	Jordan	Finał	Women of Jordan	

=== Series 2 (2010) ===
#	#	Original air date	Visited country	Polish title	English title	Audience
11	1	3 October 2010	South Africa	Mama dla hipopotama	Hippo’s Mammy RPA	1 445 176
12	2	10 October 2010	Thailand	Kobiety o długich szyjach	Women with Long Necks in Thailand	1 309 562
13	3	17 October 2010	Ethiopia	Nadzieja niewidomych (część 1)	“Hope for Blinds” in Ethiopia (Part 1)	1 487 162
14	4	24 October 2010	Ethiopia	Nadzieja niewidomych (część 2)	“Hope for Blinds” in Ethiopia (Part 2)	
15	5	31 October 2010	Borneo	Borneo – opiekunki orangutanów	Babysitter of Orangutans in Borneo	
16	6	7 November 2010	Tanzania	Tanzania – kobieta pilot	A Woman Pilot – Tanzania	
17	7	14 November 2010	Japan	Gejsza z Kioto	Geisha from Kioto, Japan	
18	8	21 November 2010	Japan	Księżniczka z Tokio	“Himegyaru Princesses” from Tokyo, Japan	
19	9	28 November 2009	Morocco	Finał	The Final in Morocco	
20	10	22 November 2009	—	Kulisy	Making of…	

=== Series 3 (2011) ===
#	#	Original air date	Visited country	Polish title	English title	Audience
21	1	4 September 2011	India	Kobieta ze świątyni szczurów	Woman from the Rat Temple	1 100 139
22	2	11 September 2011	Samoa	99% Kobiety	99% Woman	1 316 403
23	3	18 September 2011	Australia	Kobieta ekstremalna	Extreme Woman	952 380
24	4	25 September 2011	Mexico	Pogromczyni byków	A Bullfighter	1 185 365
25	5	2 October 2011	Ghana	Czarownica	A Witch	1 356 505
26	6	9 October 2011	Australia	Kangurza mama	Kangaroo's Mom	1 377 082
27	7	16 October 2011	Nepal	Żona trzech mężów	A Wife of Three Husbands	1 644 232
28	8	23 October 2011	—	Kulisy	Making of…	1 493 471

=== Series 4 (2012) ===
#	#	Original air date	Visited country	Polish title	English title	Audience
29	1	9 September 2012	Kyrgyzstan	Uprowadzona z Jurty	Taken from a Yurt	
30	2	16 September 2012	Indonesia	Piękno według Mentawajów	Shaman's Wife	1 521 059
31	3	23 September 2012	Mexico	Kobieta – wampir	Vampire Woman	
32	4	30 September 2012	India	Pogrzebana za życia	Buried Alive	1 507 365
33	5	7 October 2012	Costa Rica	Mama leniwców	Sloth's Mum	
34	6	14 October 2012	Nepal	Do pierwszej krwi	Till the First Blood	
35	7	21 October 2012	Spain	Królowa flamenco	Flamenco Queen	
36	8	28 October 2012	—	Kulisy	Making of…	1 543 457

=== Series 5 (2013) ===
#	#	Original air date	Visited country	Polish title	English title	Audience
37	1	8 September 2013	Cuba	Taksówarka z Hawany	Taxi Driver in Havana	
38	2	15 September 2013	Belize	Na ratunek krokodylom	Saving Crocodiles	
39	3	22 September 2013	South Sudan	Złota dziewczyna	Golden Girl	
40	4	29 September 2013	United States	Kobieta 5XL	XXXXXL Woman	1 270 008
41	5	6 October 2013	Albania	Zaprzysiężone dziewice	Sworn Virgins	
42	6	13 October 2013	Cuba	Santeryjska kapłanka	Priestess of Santeria	1 237 216
43	7	20 October 2013	Philippines	Życie w grobowcu	Life in a Tomb	
44	8	27 October 2013	South Sudan	Nowe życie	New Life	
45	9	3 November 2013	Thailand	Mała bokserka	Boxing Girl	
46	10	10 November 2013	—	Kulisy	Making of…	1 331 718

=== Series 6 (2014) ===
#	#	Original air date	Visited country	Polish title	English title	Audience
47	1	7 September 2014	China	Dziewczyna z Shaolin	Shaolin Kung fu Master	
48	2	14 September 2014	India	Dzieci na zamówienie	Surrogate Mother	
49	3	21 September 2014	Thailand	Być kobietą	Ladyboy	
50	4	28 September 2014	China	Królestwo kobiet	Matriarchal Mosuo Tribe	
51	5	5 October 2014	Bulgaria	Targ dziewic	Virgin Bride Market	
52	6	12 October 2014	Tanzania	Ludzie duchy	Woman from the Tribe of Ghosts (the Albinos of Africa)	
53	7	19 October 2014	Iran	Piłkarska w hidżabie	Footballer in Hijab	
54	8	26 October 2014	—	Kulisy	Making of…	

=== Series 7 (2015) ===
#	#	Original air date	Visited country	Polish title	English title	Audience
55	1	September 6, 2015	India	Najmniejsza kobieta świata	The Smallest Woman in the World	1 801 075
56	2	September 13, 2015	Philippines	Ukrzyżowana	Crucifixions	
57	3	September 20, 2015	Nigeria	Gwiazda Hollywood	Star of Nollywood	
58	4	September 27, 2015	Papua	Żona wodza	Women from the Dani Tribe	1 313 066
59	5	October 4, 2015	Bhutan	Królestwo szczęścia	Royal Family	
60	6	October 11, 2015	France	Mała Afryka	African Women in Paris	
61	7	October 18, 2015	Russia	Kraniec świata	Raindeers Breeders from Siberia	1 483 144
62	8	October 25, 2015	Indonesia	Życie po życiu	Funeral rituals among Toraja Society	
63	9	November 1, 2015	Colombia	Życie za kratami	Women Prisoners from El Buen Pastor	
64	10	November 8, 2015	—	Kulisy	Making of…	1 418 360

=== Series 8 (2016) ===
#	#	Original air date	Visited country	Polish title	English title	Audience
65	1	October 16, 2016	Romania	Stracone dzieciństwo	Lost Childhood	
66	2	October 23, 2016	Russia	Jak wyjść za mąż w trzy miesiące	How to Get Married in Three Months	
67	3	October 30, 2016	United States	Najszczęśliwsza kobieta na świecie	The Happiest Woman in the World	
68	4	November 6, 2016	South Korea	Samotni w sieci	Alone in Web	
69	5	November 13, 2016	Tanzania	Domy kobiet	Women’s Houses	
70	6	November 20, 2016	—	Kulisy	Making of…	

=== Series 9 (2017) ===
#	#	Original air date	Visited country	Polish title	English title	Audience
71	1	September 10, 2017	Malaysia	Ludzie-ryby	Fish-people	
72	2	September 17, 2017	Mongolia	Tańcząca z orłami	Dancing with Eagles	
73	3	September 24, 2017	Japan	Prawie jak kobieta	Almost Like a Woman	
74	4	October 1, 2017	Bolivia	Poza czasem	Beyond the Time	
75	5	October 8, 2017	Pakistan	Bez twarzy	Without Face	
76	6	October 15, 2017	Pakistan	Przerwana lekcja wolności	Interrupted Freedom Lesson	
77	7	October 22, 2017	Bolivia	Wspinaczka po godność	Climbing for Dignity	
78	8	October 29, 2017	Belgium	Serce matki	A Mother’s Heart	
79	9	November 5, 2017	—	Kulisy	Making of…	

== International broadcast ==
Country	Local title	TV network
Czech Republic	Žena na konci světa	Prima Zoom
France	Une femme aux antipodes	Voyage
Hong Kong	奇風異族萬里行	TVB HD Jade
Latvia	Sievietes pasaules malā	TBA
Slovakia	Žena na konci sveta	Dvojka
Spain	Mujeres de lugares remotos	Viajar
Sweden	Kvinnor vid världens ände	Kanal Global
