= Iwona Blecharczyk =

Polish lorry driver and YouTuber

- Born: Iwona Monika Blecharczyk; 24 September 1987 (age 38); Kosztowa, Poland
- Other name: Trucking Girl
- Occupations: international truck owner-operator, author, Internet personality

YouTube information
- Channel: Iwona Blecharczyk
- Years active: 2013–present
- Genres: Education; vlogging; travelling
- Subscribers: 1.19 million
- Views: 568 million
- Last updated: 25 April 2026
- Website: https://iwonablecharczyk.com/

Iwona Blecharczyk (Polish pronunciation: [iˈvɔna blɛˈxart͡ʂɨk]; born 24 September 1987) is a Polish lorry driver, transportation enthusiast and YouTuber. In 2013, she established the channel "Trucking Girl" on YouTube and then, in 2019, was awarded the title of "Barbie Shero" as a role model for girls. In 2021 she established an owner-operator transport company, Imagination Transport.

== Biography ==
Blecharczyk comes from Kosztowa, Subcarpathian Voivodeship. In 2007 she took part in the Miss Polonia beauty contest and reached the finals of Miss Polonia of Podkarpacie in Mielec. In 2010, when she graduated from university, Iwona Blecharczyk became a qualified teacher of English as a foreign language. She worked as a minibus driver on the routes from Poland to England, then she worked in the clothing industry. In 2011, she started working as a professional lorry driver.

In 2013, she founded the channel "Trucking Girl" on YouTube: she presents videos taken from her lorry cabin and talks on transport-related topics. The channel is run in two languages – Polish and English. The viewers from Poland account for about half of the audience. Outside Poland, the recordings are statistically most frequently watched in Germany, the United States, Canada and the United Kingdom. She runs fan pages on Instagram and Facebook, too. In 2017 she was the face of advertising for the EuroShell fleet card.

For six years, Blecharczyk worked in oversize transport, conveying items such as blades for wind turbines. In the period 2017–2018, she travelled to Canada and the United States, where she worked as a driver of specialized lorries, driving along, among others, the Ice Trail and the oil fields.

In 2019, Mattel awarded her (as the second Polish woman after Martyna Wojciechowska) the title of Barbie Shero. She has become the ambassador for the Volvo Trucks company. She was invited to participate as a speaker at a TEDx conference and has worked as a volunteer driver. In Poland, Discovery Channel chose Blecharczyk to present the TV series Przygody truckerki (Trucker woman's adventures). Articles on Blecharczyk have appeared in, among others, (in German) weekly Die Zeit, Der Spiegel Panorama, (in French) Canadian daily La Presse from Montreal, the website metropolitaine.fr from Bordeaux, and (in Hungarian) the website on transport (vezess.hu).

In 2020, Muza S.A. published a 320-page book by Blecharczyk titled Trucking girl. 70-metrową ciężarówką przez świat (en: Trucking girl. With a 70-meter truck through the world) (ISBN 978-83-287-1519-6), on topics similar to her internet activities. In 2021, Blecharczyk established her company Imagination Transport, driving her Volvo FH13 truck-and-trailer set. In 2023 the company expanded into oversize transport using a Volvo FH16 and a Goldhofer seven-axle semi-low-loader trailer.
