= Jan Krawiec =

Polish-American journalist, historian, and political activist (1919–2020)

Jan Krawiec (15 June 1919 — 28 October 2020) was a Polish-American journalist, historian, and political activist. He was chief editor of Chicago's leading Polish language newspaper.

== Biography ==
Krawiec was born in Bachórzec, Poland. He finished his officer training shortly before the World War II and participated in the defense of Poland. On 17 September 1939, 16 days after the Germans invaded Poland, Krawiec joined the underground and ran a secret newspaper until he was arrested by the Germans in April 1943. He was transported to Auschwitz, where he did slave labor instead of being immediately murdered, since he was a Polish Catholic. He was later transferred to Buchenwald. In April 1945, the Germans evacuated the prison camp and forced the inmates, including Krawiec, on a death march until they were freed by American troops.

In 1949, he arrived in Chicago and worked for ten years as a mechanic for Canfield Beverage Company. He earned a degree from Loyola University in political science. He then became a writer for a Polish-language newspaper, Dziennik Chicagoski. He later moved to competing newspaper Dziennik Związkowy. He was appointed editor-in-chief and remained such until 1985 when he retired. He was part of President Nixon's press pool during his presidential visit to Poland.

Krawiec never married. He contracted COVID-19 in October 2020, and died two weeks later at the age of 101.
