= Roman Karaś =

Polish politician (1953–2025)

Member of the Senate of Poland
- In office 19 September 1993 – 20 October 1997
- Constituency: Krosno Voivodeship

Personal details
- Born: Roman Władysław Karaś; 9 June 1953; Sielnica, Poland
- Died: 20 June 2025 (aged 72)
- Political party: PSL
- Education: Jagiellonian University
- Occupation: Lawyer

Roman Władysław Karaś (9 June 1953 – 20 June 2025) was a Polish politician. A member of the Polish People's Party, he served in the Senate from 1993 to 1997.

Karaś died on 20 June 2025, at the age of 72.
