= Kruszynek, Włocławek County =

Kruszynek
- Village
- Location within Poland
- Coordinates: 52°33′51″N 18°59′36″E
- Country: Poland
- Voivodeship: Kuyavian-Pomeranian
- County: Włocławek
- Gmina: Włocławek

Kruszynek [kruˈʂɨnɛk] is a village in the administrative district of Gmina Włocławek, within Włocławek County, Kuyavian-Pomeranian Voivodeship, in north-central Poland.
