= Martyna Wojciechowska =

Polish writer, presenter and mountaineer

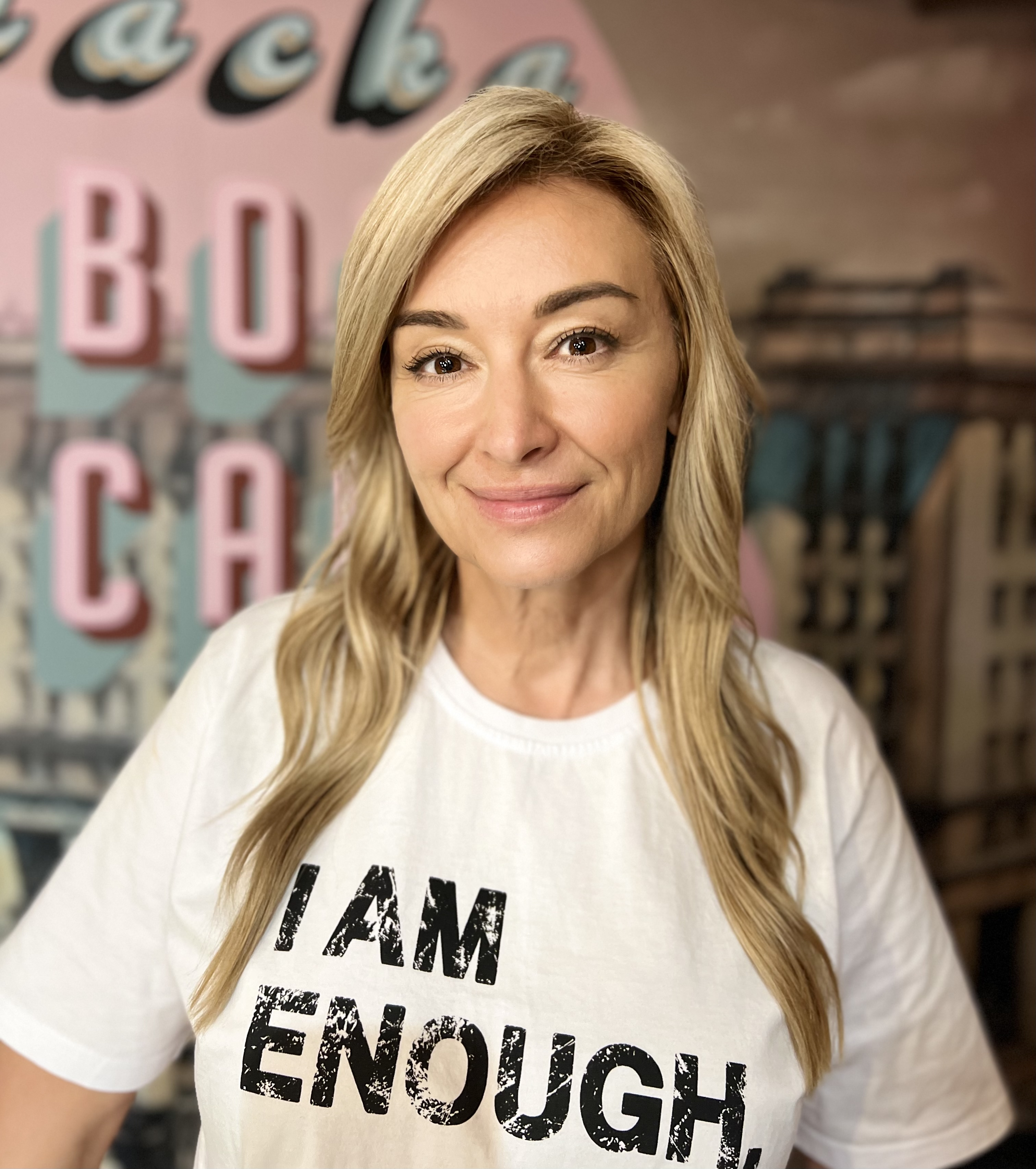
- Wojciechowska in 2023
- Born: 28 September 1974 (age 51); Warsaw, Poland
- Occupations: TV host and author
- Known for: Adventure, mountaineering

Martyna Wojciechowska (Polish pronunciation: [marˈtɨna vɔjt͡ɕɛˈxɔfska]; born 28 September 1974 in Warsaw as Marta Eliza Wojciechowska) is a Polish TV presenter, mountaineer, traveller, journalist, sportswoman and writer. In 2010, she completed the Seven Summits. She presents the television series Kobieta na krańcu świata (Woman at the Edge of the World), and is the editor in chief of National Geographic Poland.

== Media career ==
At the age of 19, Wojciechowska began her career as a presenter for the iconic automotive program “Automaniak” for Polish broadcaster TVN. She presented programs including Big Brother, Mission Martyna, and Kids with Class. Since September 2009 she has presented the weekly series Woman at the edge of the world. As a journalist, she worked for magazines including The world of motorbikes (Swiat motocykli), Auto moto, Playboy and Voyage. In February 2007 she became the editor in chief of National Geographic Poland and National Geographic Traveler. She is also a head editor of Polish-English monthly travel magazine Kaleidscope.

== The woman at the edge of the world ==
The series started in 2008 and is now in its 10th season. It is aired every Sunday at TVN. Each episode focuses on Martyna traveling to a different country where she meets a new woman. Along with introducing the story of the main character, the program reveals the bigger picture of the hosting country and women’s status. The series covers female points of view, but occasionally episodes will also feature male subjects. Every episode brings out social issues from within the host country, among them: sexism, violence, poverty, animal cruelty, human trafficking, work ethics, and human rights. Among many topics, it has featured: the smallest woman in the world Jyoti Amage, a Colombian female wrestler, a student of the Shaolin School, a geisha from Kyoto, women of the Long Necks Tribe in Myanmar, a female sapper, a female pilot from Tanzania and fa’afafine people of Samoa.

== The ghost people ==
In 2015, one of the episodes of Woman at the edge of the world was made into a longer documentary film, directed by Wojciechowska and Marek Kłosowicz. The Ghost People (Ludzie duchy) won a Golden Nymph Award in the category Current Affairs Documentary. It tells the story of albino children in Tanzania who are being hunted for their limbs, which are believed to have magical healing powers. The main character, 17-year-old Kabula, lost her arm, which was cut off by anonymous attackers. Wojciechowska created the special charity ‘Between heaven and earth’ (‘Między niebem, a ziemią’) which collected around 100.000 złoty (USD 26,000) to help Kabula make her dream of becoming a lawyer come true.

== Seven Summits ==
In August 2002 Wojciechowska began her expedition to climb the seven tallest mountains on Earth, starting with Mont Blanc. On 22 January 2010, she summited her last mountain, Mount Carstensz, becoming the third Polish woman to achieve that and the second to do it in the Reinhold Messner way. Her expedition was featured in the 55 minute long documentary Korona Ziemi (The crown of Earth) and two books Przesunąć horyzont (Move the Horizon) and Misja Everest (Mission Everest).

In 2004, while filming one of her programmes ‘Mission Martyna’ in Iceland, she had a serious car accident in which her friend and cameraman Rafał Łukaszewicz died and Wojciechowska broke her spine. She promised herself she would get better and after long therapy in May 2006 she climbed Mount Everest. The events were described in her book Przesunąć horyzont (Move the Horizon).

In 2007, when she was three months pregnant, she summited Mount Elbrus. When her daughter was 8 months old she decided to go to Antarctica to summit Vinson Massif, the highest mountain of the continent. At 4000 meters the expedition was surprised by a strong snowstorm which completely destroyed Wojciechowska’s tent. For dozens of hours, the group was trapped in their tents with the temperature at -30 °C and without food. Subsequently, many tabloids criticized Wojciechowska for risking her life and being an irresponsible mother.

Mountains summited

- Mont Blanc (28 August 2002)
- Mount Kilimanjaro (26 February 2003)
- Aconcagua (11 February 2006)
- Island Peak (11 April 2006)
- Mount Everest (18 May 2006)
- Denali (11 June 2007)
- Elbrus (29 August 2007)
- Vinson Massif (2 January 2009)
- Mount Carstensz (22 January 2010)
- K2 (31 July 2012)

== Personal life ==
Wojciechowska has a daughter, Maria (born 17 April 2008). Maria’s father, Polish scuba diver Jerzy Blaszczyk, who was separated from Martyna at the time, died in 2016. In 2015, rumors grew around Wojciechowska’s possible health problems. She lost around 20 kg and the media speculated that she had a tropical disease. Wojciechowska wrote an official public statement in which she asked the media to respect her privacy. She did not name the illness, but denied the rumors claiming that it was malaria.

In September 2016, she mentioned on her official Facebook page that she had had a serious motorcycle accident in which she ended up with a broken collarbone. A week later she was back at the set of ‘Woman at the edge of the world’ which caused her further health complications and she had to have another operation. The new season had to be postponed. In October 2016 Wojciechowska announced that TVN was going to run half of the season, using all the episodes she managed to record before the accident.

== Sports career ==
Wojciechowska has been a licensed racing driver since the age of 17. In 2002, she took part in Paris – Dakar Rally and finished it as the first Polish woman and the first woman from Central Eastern Europe.

== Recognition as a role model ==
In 2018, Mattel announced the creation of a Shero Barbie doll with Wojciechowska's image for her contributions to "breaking stereotypes and inspiring women and girls around the world" to pursue their dreams. She is the third Polish woman to have one alongside Anita Włodarczyk and Iwona Blecharczyk.

== Awards ==
- 2009: Róże Gali Plebiscyt (The Beautiful Web-Roses (Gala Magazine)
- 2010: Woman of the Year 2009 Award from the magazine Twój Styl (Your Style)
- 2010: MediaTory – University Students' Journalism Awards in the AkumulaTOR category
- 2011: Nagroda Bursztynowego Motyla im. Arkadego Fiedlera for her book Kobieta na krańcu świata 2
- 2011: Personality of the Year Media 2011: Złota Kropa Onetu in the Greatest Female Personality of Pop Culture category
- 2013: Bestseller Empiku in the Multibrand Concept category for her book series "Zwierzaki świata"
- 2014: National Geographic Internetional Media Conference 2014, Best Book Project Award for her book series Dzieciaki świata and Zwierzaki świata
- 2015: Wiktor Award 2014 in the Exceptional Personality of the Year category
- 2015: Złota Nimfa Award at the Monte Carlo Film Festival for her documentary Ludzie Duchy (Ghost People)
- 2015: ReformaTOR Award in the MediaTory Plebiscite for her documentary Ludzie Duchy (Ghost People)

== Bibliography ==
- Przesunąć horyzont (Move the Horizon) (ISBN 83-7515-010-X)
- Misja Everest (Mission Everest) (ISBN 83-7515-009-6)
- Etiopia. Ale czat! (Ethiopia. But the Chat!) (ISBN 978-83-7596-064-8)
- Kobieta na krańcu świata (Woman at the Edge of the World) (ISBN 978-83-7596-079-2)
- Kobieta na krańcu świata 2 (Woman at the Edge of the World 2) (ISBN 978-83-7596-110-2)
- Kobieta na krańcu świata 3 (Woman at the Edge of the World 3) ISBN 978-83-7596-209-3)
- Zapiski (pod)różne (Travel journals) (ISBN 978-83-7596-182-9)
- Automaniaczka. Od rometa do Rajdu Dakar (Automaniac) (ISBN 978-83-7778-101-2)
- Dzieciaki Świata (Children of the World), 2013 (ISBN 978-83-7596-507-0)
- Zwierzaki Świata (Animals of the World) (ISBN 978-83-7596508-7)

== Filmography ==
- 2002: Jak to się robi z dziewczynami (How To Do It With Girls): as journalist
- 2005: Anioł Stróż (Guardian Angel) (TV series): as teacher
- 2006: Auta (Cars) (voice role): as reporter Turbicka
