= Piątkowa, Przemyśl County =

Piątkowa
- Village
- Location within Poland
- Coordinates: 49°45′38″N 22°21′42″E
- Country: Poland
- Voivodeship: Subcarpathian
- County: Przemyśl
- Gmina: Dubiecko

Piątkowa [pjɔntˈkɔva] is a village in the administrative district of Gmina Dubiecko, within Przemyśl County, Subcarpathian Voivodeship, in south-eastern Poland.
