= Ruda, Włocławek County =

Ruda
- Village
- Location within Poland
- Coordinates: 52°35′47″N 19°17′52″E
- Country: Poland
- Voivodeship: Kuyavian-Pomeranian
- County: Włocławek
- Gmina: Włocławek
- Time zone: UTC+1 (CET)
  - Summer (DST): UTC+2 (CEST)

Ruda [ˈruda] is a village in the administrative district of Gmina Włocławek, within Włocławek County, Kuyavian-Pomeranian Voivodeship, in central Poland.
