= Śliwnica, Gmina Dubiecko =

Śliwnica
- Village
- Location within Poland
- Coordinates: 49°51′21″N 22°24′46″E
- Country: Poland
- Voivodeship: Subcarpathian
- County: Przemyśl
- Gmina: Dubiecko
- Highest elevation: 440 m (1,440 ft)
- Lowest elevation: 290 m (950 ft)
- Population: 700

Śliwnica [ɕlivˈnit͡sa] is a village in the administrative district of Gmina Dubiecko, within Przemyśl County, Subcarpathian Voivodeship, in south-eastern Poland.
