= Dubiecko =

- Town
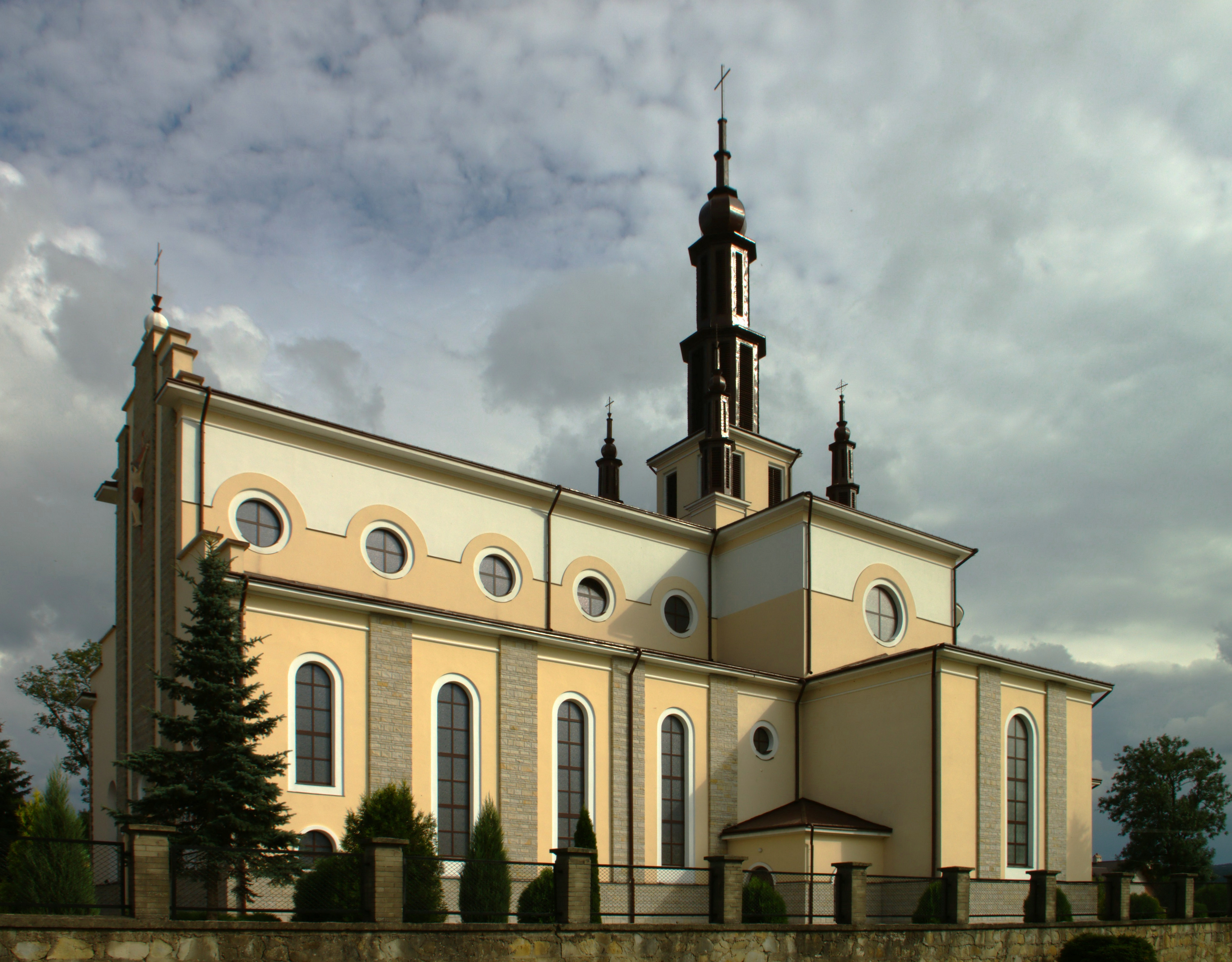
- Church of Immaculate Heart of Mary in Dubiecko

- Coat of arms

- Location within Poland
- Coordinates: 49°49′32″N 22°23′24″E
- Country: Poland
- Voivodeship: Subcarpathian
- County: Przemyśl
- Gmina: Dubiecko
- Town rights: 1407
- Highest elevation: 370 m (1,210 ft)
- Lowest elevation: 280 m (920 ft)
- Population: 1,150
- Time zone: UTC+1 (CET)
  - Summer (DST): UTC+2 (CEST)
- Vehicle registration: RPR
- Website: www.dubiecko.itl.pl

Dubiecko (Note: Polish: [duˈbjɛt͡skɔ]; Yiddish: דיבעצק, romanized: Dubetzk; Ukrainian: Дубецько, romanized: Dubetsʹko) is a town in Przemyśl County, Subcarpathian Voivodeship, in southeastern Poland. It is the seat of the gmina (administrative district) called Gmina Dubiecko. The town has a population of 1,150.

== History ==
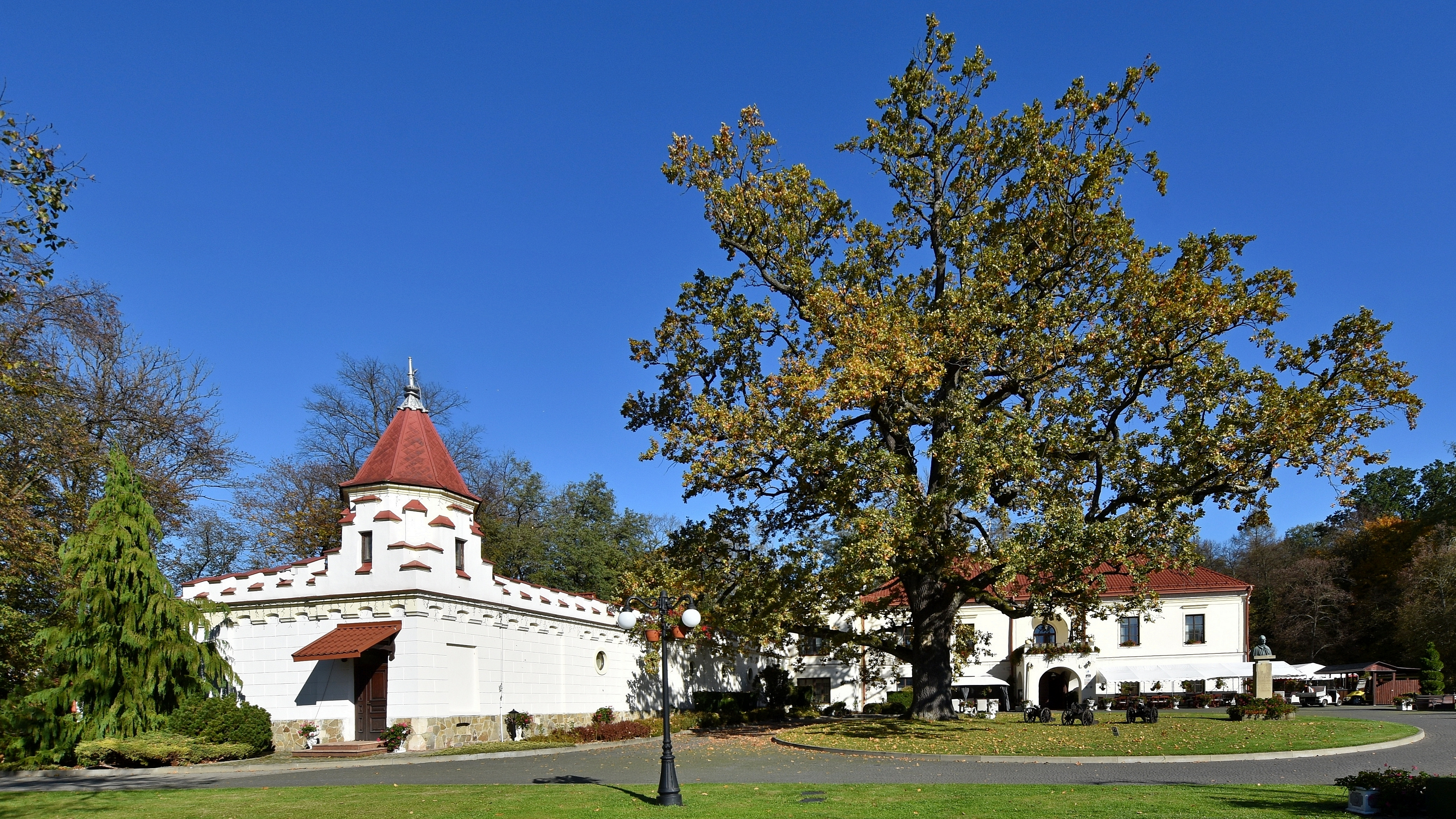
Dubiecko Castle

In 1389, Polish King Władysław II Jagiełło granted the royal village of Dubiecko to castellan Piotr Kmita. In 1407, King Władysław II granted town rights, while Piotr Kmita established a Catholic parish church.

As a result of the First Partition of Poland, in 1772, the town was annexed by Austria and made part of the newly formed Kingdom of Galicia and Lodomeria, within which it was administratively located in the Przemyśl county (Bezirkshauptmannschaft). Following World War I, in 1918, Poland regained independence and control of the town.

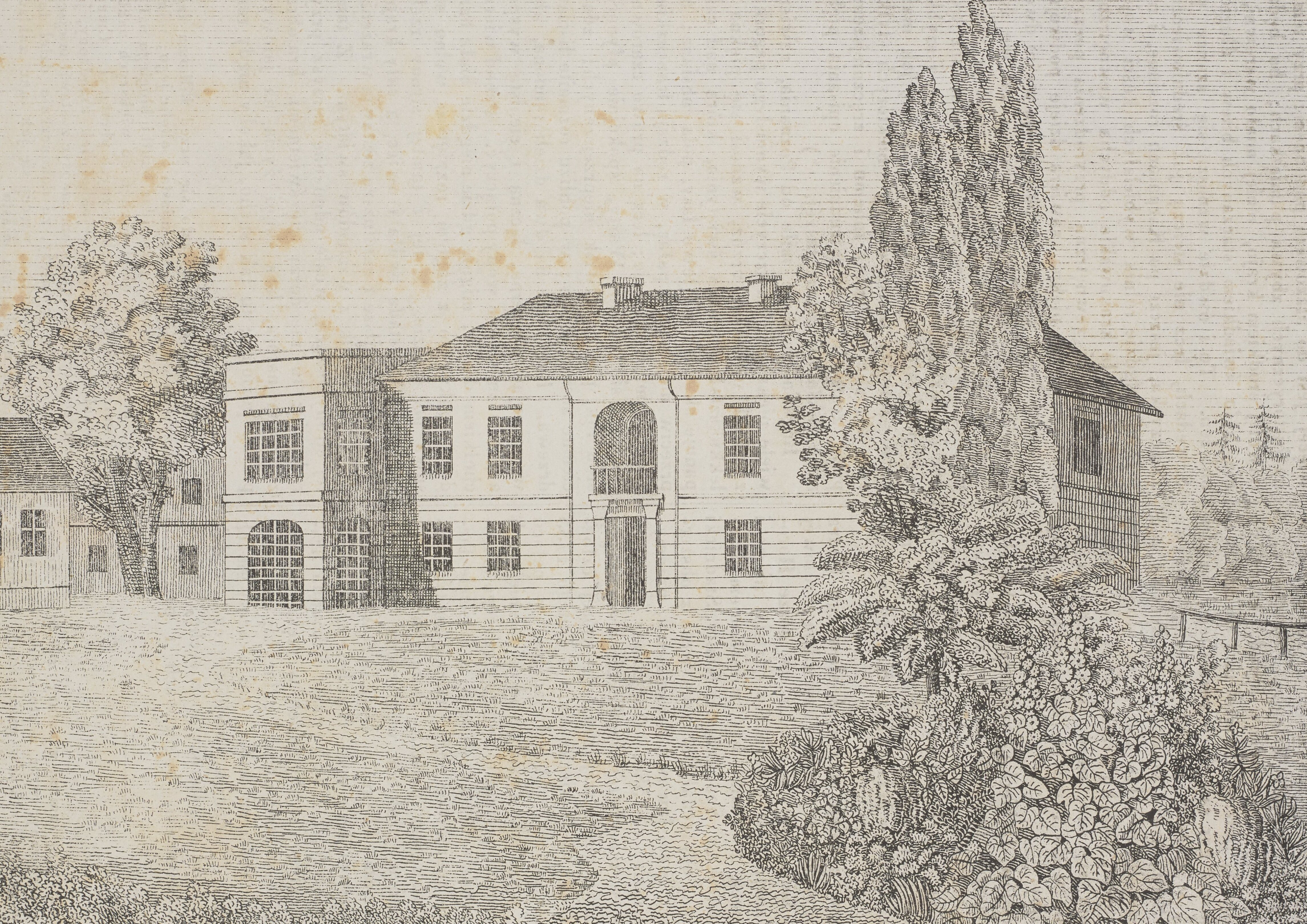
Palace between 1823 and 1849

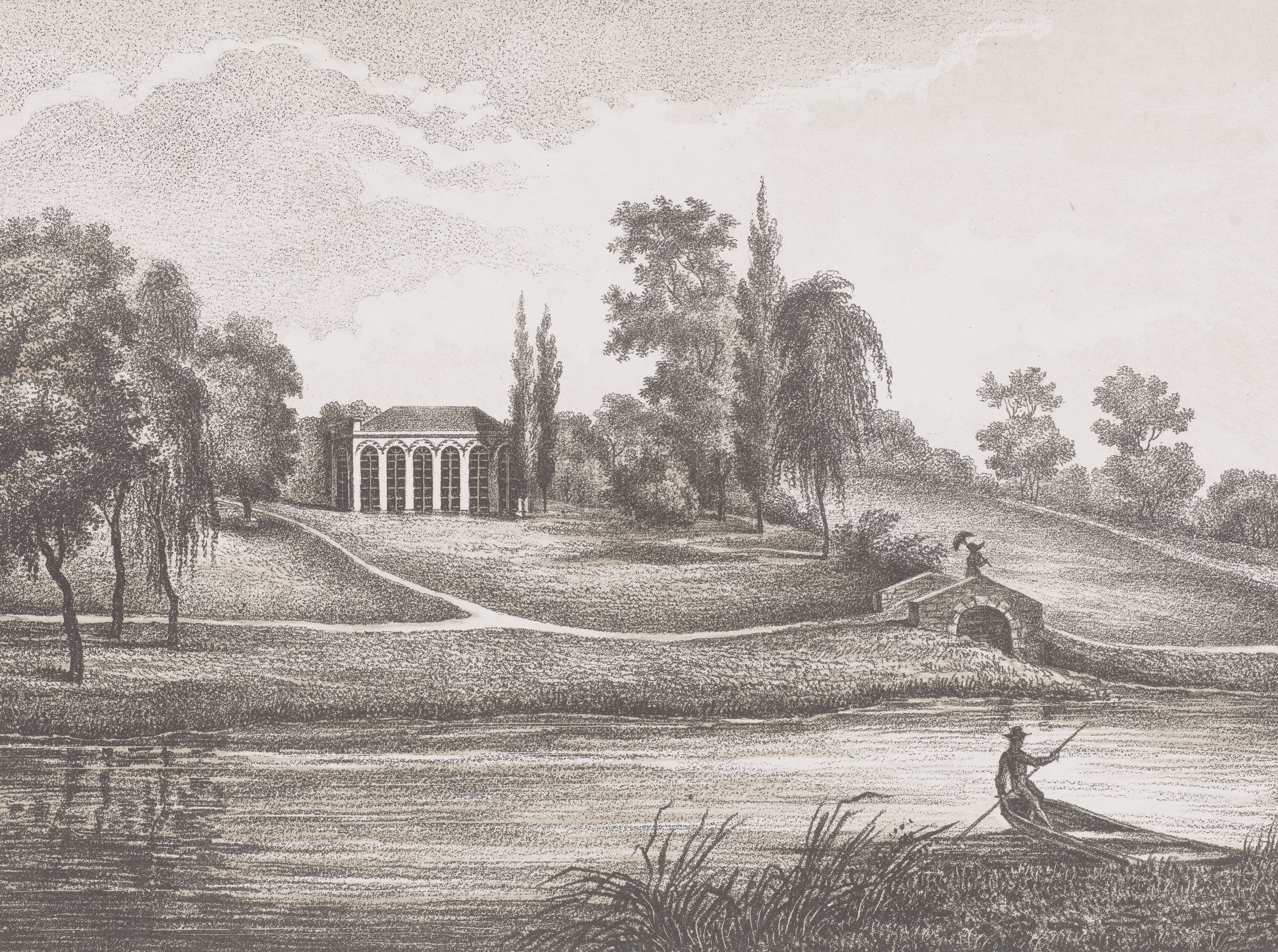
Garden in Dubiecko, before 1825

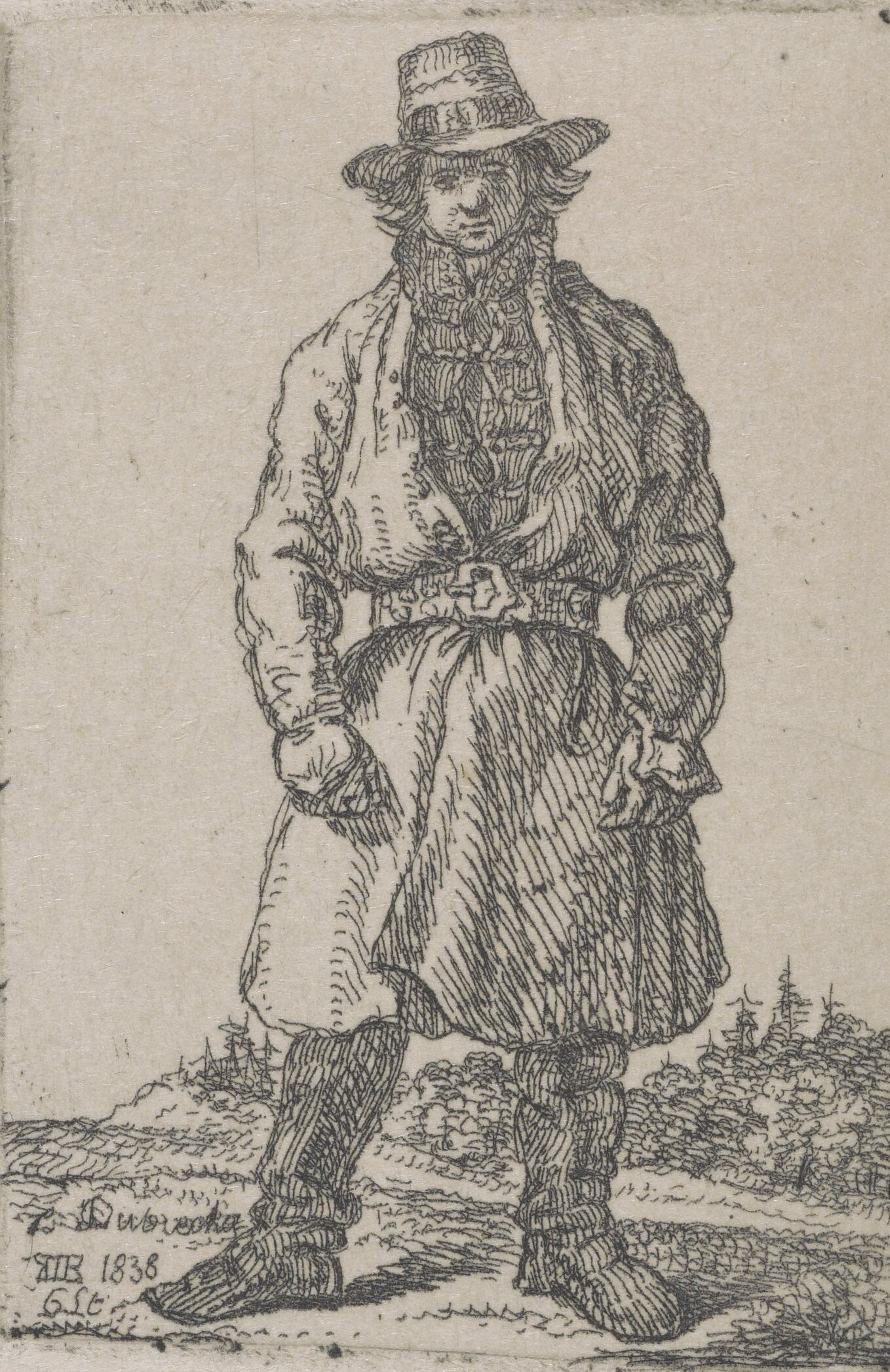
A boy in a regional costume from Dubiecko, 1838

=== Jewish history ===
The town had about 1000 Jews, most of them Hassidic (ultra orthodox), and several religious Zionists.

On September 17, 1939, (On the Jewish 'Gedalya' fast day) German soldiers entered Dubiecko, two days after the slaughter of the Jews of Dynów on the second day of Rosh Hashana (September 15, 1939). They caught 11 Jews and killed them, burning the synagogues and beating the men attempting to save holy scrolls, including the Rabbis.

A week later (eve of the Succoth festivities week), on September 27 the remaining Jews were ordered to assemble at the town square. From there they were marched across the border, and the San river, while being beaten and brutalized, to Soviet territory. Some drowned during the crossing. Peasants on both sides of the river robbed the Jews of whatever little possessions they had. Some ended up in Przemyśl others in Lwów. Many perished on the way. The young Rebbe of the town perished with his wife in Przemyśl, after returning from Jerusalem to Poland just before the war. Most of the remaining Jews perished later after Operation Barbarossa in June 1941, almost two years later.

== Notable people ==
- Ignacy Krasicki (1735–1801), Polish poet, bishop, playwright, encyclopedist, Prince-Bishop of Warmia, Archbishop of Gniezno and Primate of Poland

== Sports ==
The local football club is Pogórze Dubiecko. It competes in the lower leagues.
