= Dara, Snina district =

Dara
- Location within Slovakia
- Coordinates: 49°03′15″N 22°17′52″E
- Country: Slovakia
- Region: Prešov Region
- Districts: Snina District

Population (2024)
  - Total: 0
  - Density: 0/km^{2} (0/sq mi)
- Time zone: UTC+1 (CET)
  - Summer (DST): UTC+2 (CEST)

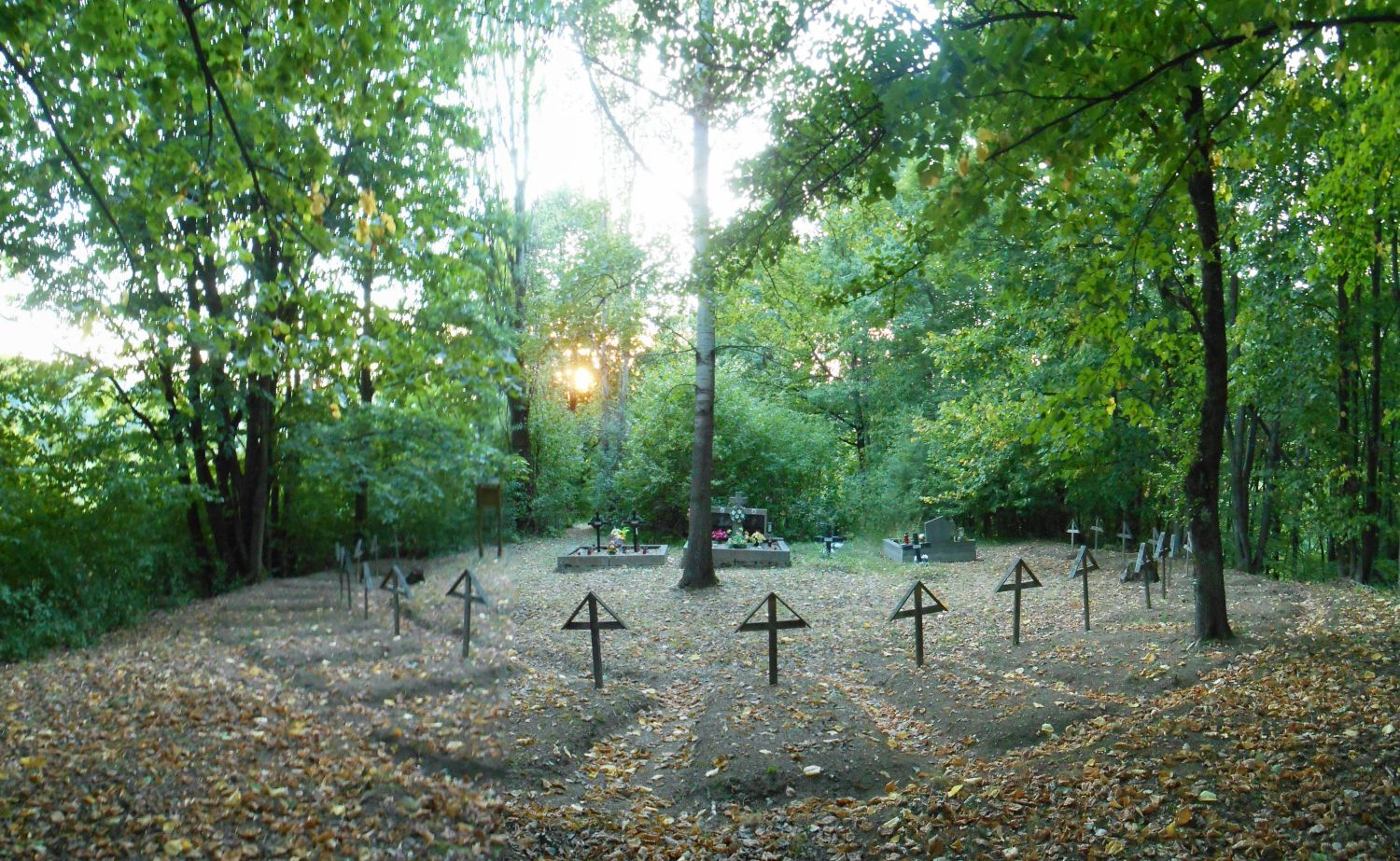

Dara is a former Ruthenian village in eastern Slovakia, in Snina District. The first mention of the village was in 1598. The village originally belonged to the noble families of Humenné, later given to some other noble families. The village was destroyed for the construction of the Starina reservoir in 1986 with six other villages. The only thing remaining is an Orthodox church of 1956, which stands on the site of a wooden chapel from 1746. The territory now lies within Poloniny National Park.
