= Dziennik Związkowy =

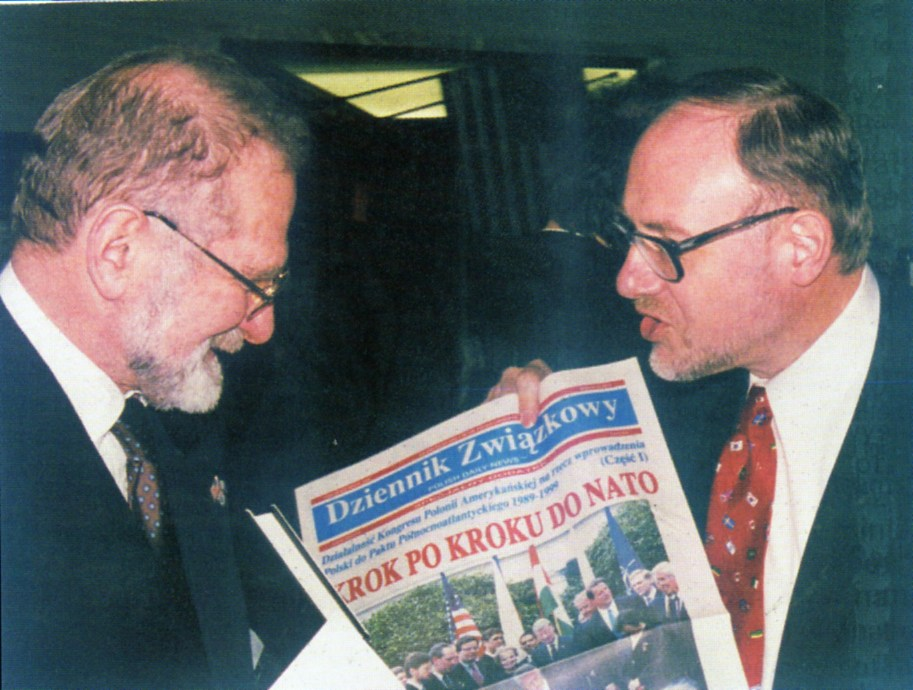
- Les Kuczynski, Executive Director of the Polish American Congress presents a copy of Dziennik Zwiazkowy to Bronislaw Geremek, Minister of Foreign Affairs of Poland, 1999
- Native name: Polish Daily News
- Type: Daily
- Owner: Polish National Alliance
- Publisher: Alliance Printers & Publishers
- Editor-in-chief: Małgorzata Błaszczuk
- Deputy editor: Elizabeth Glinka
- Language: Polish
- Website: dziennikzwiazkowy.com

Dziennik Związkowy (Polish pronunciation: [ˈd͡ʑɛɲɲik zvjɔ̃ˈskɔvɨ], Union Daily) or Polish Daily News, is the largest and the oldest Polish language newspaper in the United States.

Established in 1908 in Chicago as an organ of the Polish National Alliance (PNA) from whose headquarters at Polonia Triangle in Chicago's Polish Downtown the paper was originally printed. Considered the leading voice of Chicago's Polonia, Dziennik Związkowy has been published without break from its founding in 1908 until the present day, making it the oldest Polish language newspaper in the world published without interruption. Jan Krawiec was editor-in-chief from the early 1960s until 1985.

Its weekend edition of about one hundred pages has a circulation of about 30,000. The paper is published and sold throughout the Chicago metropolitan area, and—as a subscription—elsewhere in the United States. Copies are also sent for distribution to Poland, to research libraries, and to Poland's parliament, the Sejm.

Dziennik Związkowy is published 5 times every week covering diverse topics from local news to sports, culture as well as extensive coverage of Poland and Polish-related topics in the English Language press. A slimmer daily edition is released Monday through Thursday while an extensive "Weekend Edition" is published every Friday with a wide array of special sections and inserts along with an additional magazine titled "Kalejdoskop". Additionally, a section aimed at Chicago's large Góral community appears, titled "The Highlander Chronicle" or Kronika podhalańska in Polish is published every Wednesday in the Dziennik Związkowy.

The newspaper is a subsidiary of the PNA, a Polish-American fraternal organization. The current president of the PNA is Frank Spula. Dziennik Związkowy is published by Alliance Printers & Publishers Inc.

Magdalena Pantelis is the general manager of Polish Daily News, and Alliance Printers & Publishers. The present editor in chief is Małgorzata Błaszczuk, and deputy editor is Elizabeth Glinka. Other editorial staff members are: Andrew Z. Kazimierczak, Alicia Otap, Krystyna Cygielska, Ewa Malcher, Michał Duch.
