= Adaminowo =

- Village
- Location within Poland
- Coordinates: 52°35′43″N 19°16′18″E
- Country: Poland
- Voivodeship: Kuyavian-Pomeranian
- County: Włocławek
- Gmina: Włocławek
- Population: 70

Adaminowo [adamiˈnɔvɔ] is a village in the administrative district of Gmina Włocławek, within Włocławek County, Kuyavian-Pomeranian Voivodeship, in north-central Poland.
