= Warząchewka Nowa =

- Village
- Location within Poland
- Coordinates: 52°35′13″N 19°4′32″E
- Country: Poland
- Voivodeship: Kuyavian-Pomeranian
- County: Włocławek
- Gmina: Włocławek
- Population: 110

Warząchewka Nowa [vaʐɔ̃ˈxɛfka ˈnɔva] is a village in the administrative district of Gmina Włocławek, within Włocławek County, Kuyavian-Pomeranian Voivodeship, in north-central Poland.
