= Veľká Poľana =

- Location within Slovakia
- Coordinates: 49°07′36″N 22°14′44″E
- Country: Slovakia
- Region: Prešov Region
- Districts: Snina District

Population (2001)
  - Total: 0
  - Density: 0/km^{2} (0/sq mi)
- Time zone: UTC+1 (CET)
  - Summer (DST): UTC+2 (CEST)

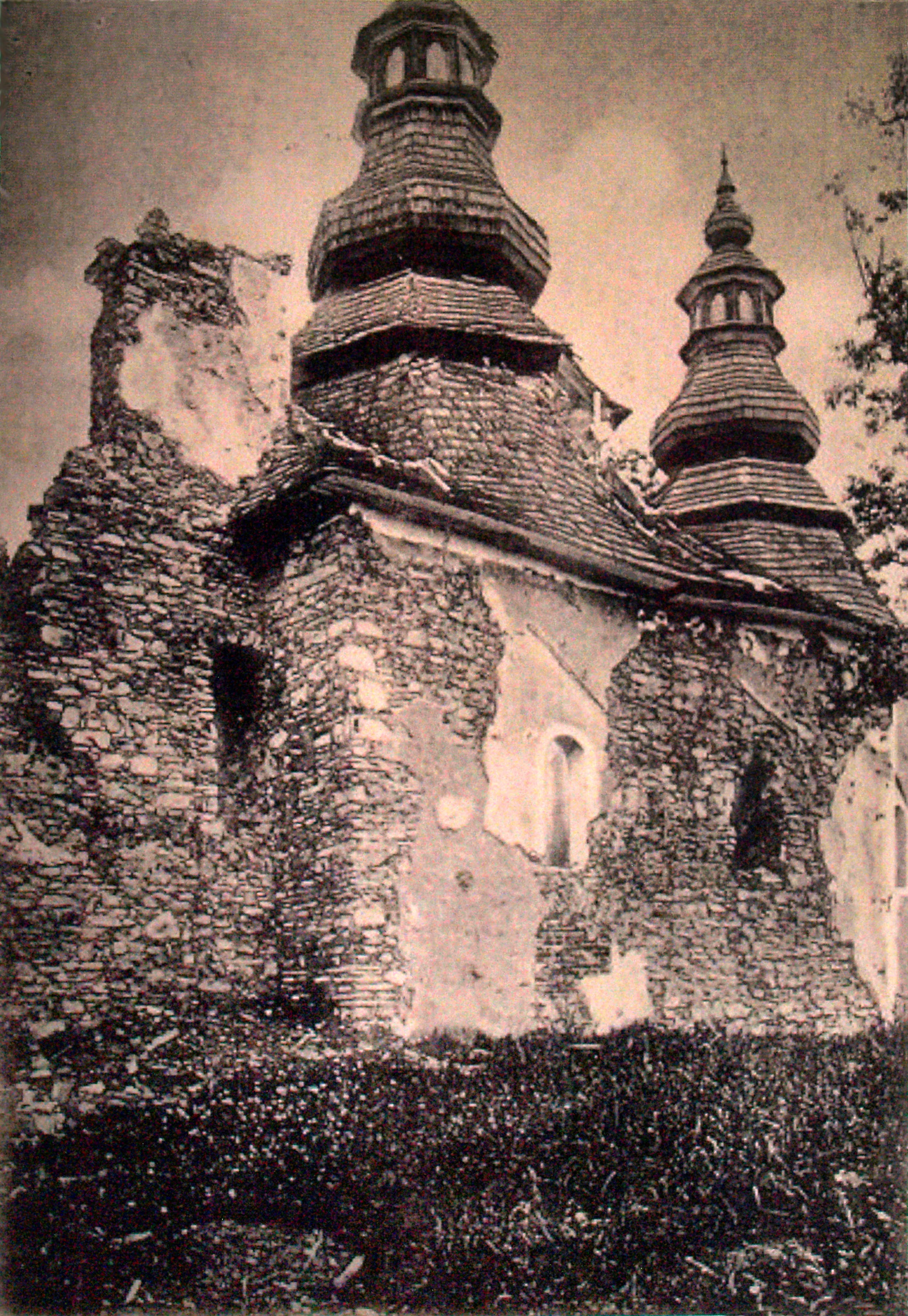
Veľka polana in 1915

Veľká Poľana (Hungarian: Nagypolány) is a Ruthenian village in eastern Slovakia, in Snina District. The first mention of the village was in 1493. The village originally belonged to the noble families of Humenné, later given to some other noble families. The village was destroyed to make way for the Starina reservoir, along with six other villages. The only things remaining are a World War I cemetery, the village cemetery and a cottage. The territory now lies within Poloniny National Park.
