= Kruszyn, Włocławek County =

Kruszyn
- Village
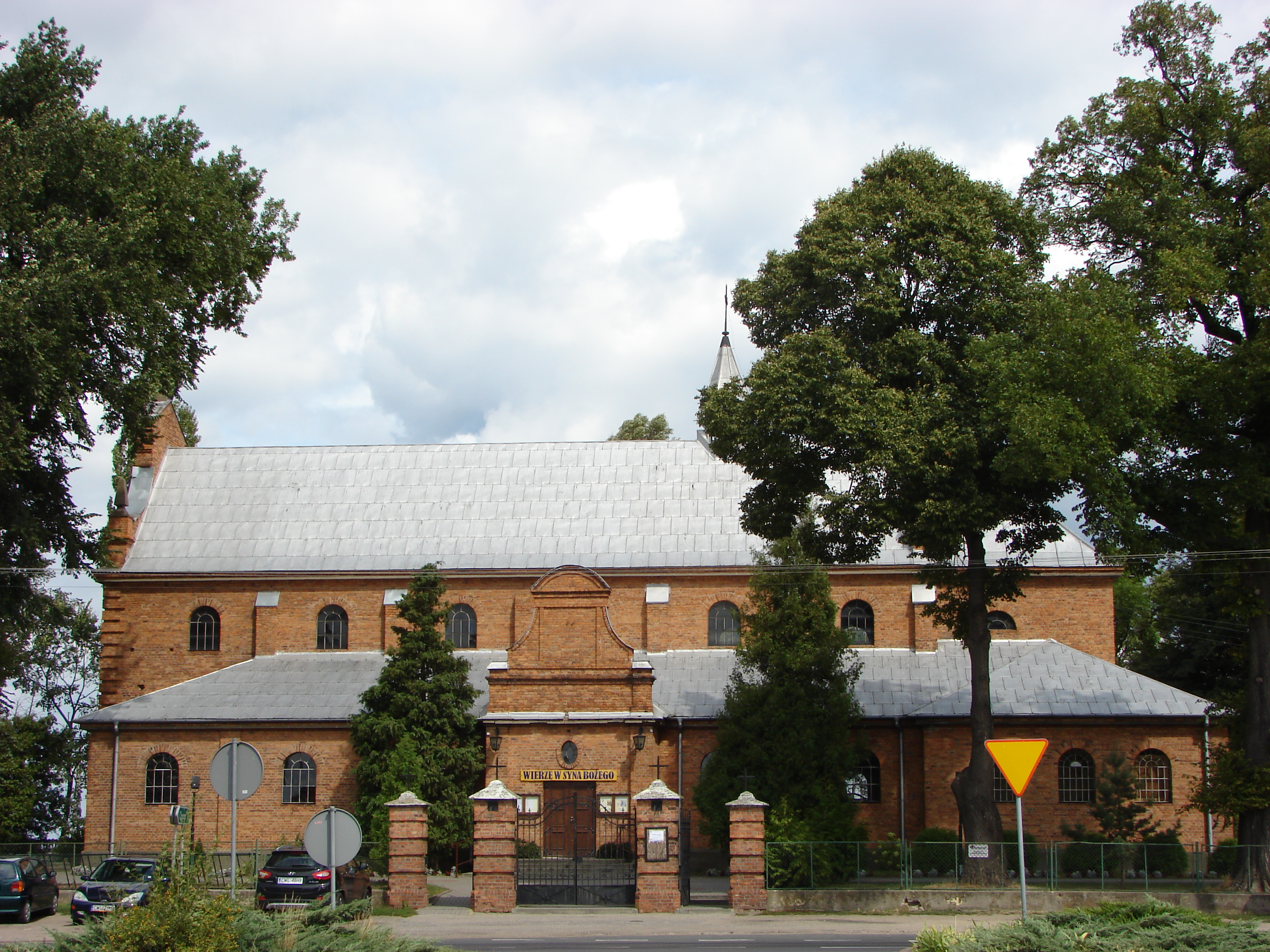
- Parish church

- Location within Poland
- Coordinates: 52°34′N 19°0′E
- Country: Poland
- Voivodeship: Kuyavian-Pomeranian
- County: Włocławek
- Gmina: Włocławek
- Population: 668

Kruszyn [ˈkruʂɨn] is a village in the administrative district of Gmina Włocławek, within Włocławek County, Kuyavian-Pomeranian Voivodeship, in north-central Poland.

== History ==
The first mention of Kruszyn came in 1314 as a wooden church. For many centuries, under both Polish and Prussian rule, it was owned by several wealthy estates. In 1941, much of the town was razed by the Nazis but it was later rebuilt.
