= Koszanowo, Kuyavian-Pomeranian Voivodeship =

Koszanowo
- Village
- Location within Poland
- Coordinates: 52°32′58″N 18°56′18″E
- Country: Poland
- Voivodeship: Kuyavian-Pomeranian
- County: Włocławek
- Gmina: Włocławek

Koszanowo [kɔʂaˈnɔvɔ] is a village in the administrative district of Gmina Włocławek, within Włocławek County, Kuyavian-Pomeranian Voivodeship, in north-central Poland.
