= Iskań =

- Village
- Location within Poland
- Coordinates: 49°47′N 22°27′E
- Country: Poland
- Voivodeship: Subcarpathian
- County: Przemyśl
- Gmina: Dubiecko

Iskań [ˈiskaɲ] is a village in the administrative district of Gmina Dubiecko, within Przemyśl County, Subcarpathian Voivodeship, in south-eastern Poland.
