= Józefowo, Gmina Włocławek =

Józefowo
- Village
- Location within Poland
- Coordinates: 52°37′40″N 19°10′40″E
- Country: Poland
- Voivodeship: Kuyavian-Pomeranian
- County: Włocławek
- Gmina: Włocławek
- Population: 200

Józefowo (Polish: [juzɛˈfɔvɔ]; German: 1943–45 Josefssee) is a village in the administrative district of Gmina Włocławek, within Włocławek County, Kuyavian-Pomeranian Voivodeship, in north-central Poland.

== History ==
Jozefowo was laid out in the middle of the forest. The permission to clear the forest was given to the settlers by the bishop of Kuyavian in 1772 without any privilege.
