= Dąb Wielki =

- Village
- Location within Poland
- Coordinates: 52°36′45″N 19°22′12″E
- Country: Poland
- Voivodeship: Kuyavian-Pomeranian
- County: Włocławek
- Gmina: Włocławek

Dąb Wielki (Polish pronunciation: [dɔmp ˈfjɛlkʲi]) is a village in the administrative district of Gmina Włocławek, within Włocławek County, Kuyavian-Pomeranian Voivodeship, in north-central Poland.
