= Wójtowskie =

- Village
- Location within Poland
- Coordinates: 52°35′21″N 19°9′31″E
- Country: Poland
- Voivodeship: Kuyavian-Pomeranian
- County: Włocławek
- Gmina: Włocławek

Wójtowskie [vui̯ˈtɔfskʲɛ] is a village in the administrative district of Gmina Włocławek, within Włocławek County, Kuyavian-Pomeranian Voivodeship, in north-central Poland.
