= Dąb Mały =

- Village
- Location within Poland
- Coordinates: 52°36′N 19°22′E
- Country: Poland
- Voivodeship: Kuyavian-Pomeranian
- County: Włocławek
- Gmina: Włocławek

Dąb Mały [ˈdɔmp ˈmawɨ] is a village in the administrative district of Gmina Włocławek, within Włocławek County, Kuyavian-Pomeranian Voivodeship, in north-central Poland.
