= Modzerowo, Gmina Włocławek =

Modzerowo
- Village
- Location within Poland
- Coordinates: 52°38′42″N 19°11′16″E
- Country: Poland
- Voivodeship: Kuyavian-Pomeranian
- County: Włocławek
- Gmina: Włocławek
- Population: 350

Modzerowo [mɔd͡zɛˈrɔvɔ] is a village in the administrative district of Gmina Włocławek, within Włocławek County, Kuyavian-Pomeranian Voivodeship, in north-central Poland.
