= Łuba Druga =

- Village
- Location within Poland
- Coordinates: 52°37′56″N 19°00′33″E
- Country: Poland
- Voivodeship: Kuyavian-Pomeranian
- County: Włocławek
- Gmina: Włocławek

Łuba Druga [ˈwuba ˈdruɡa] is a village in the administrative district of Gmina Włocławek, within Włocławek County, Kuyavian-Pomeranian Voivodeship, in north-central Poland.
