= Świętosław, Włocławek County =

Świętosław
- Village
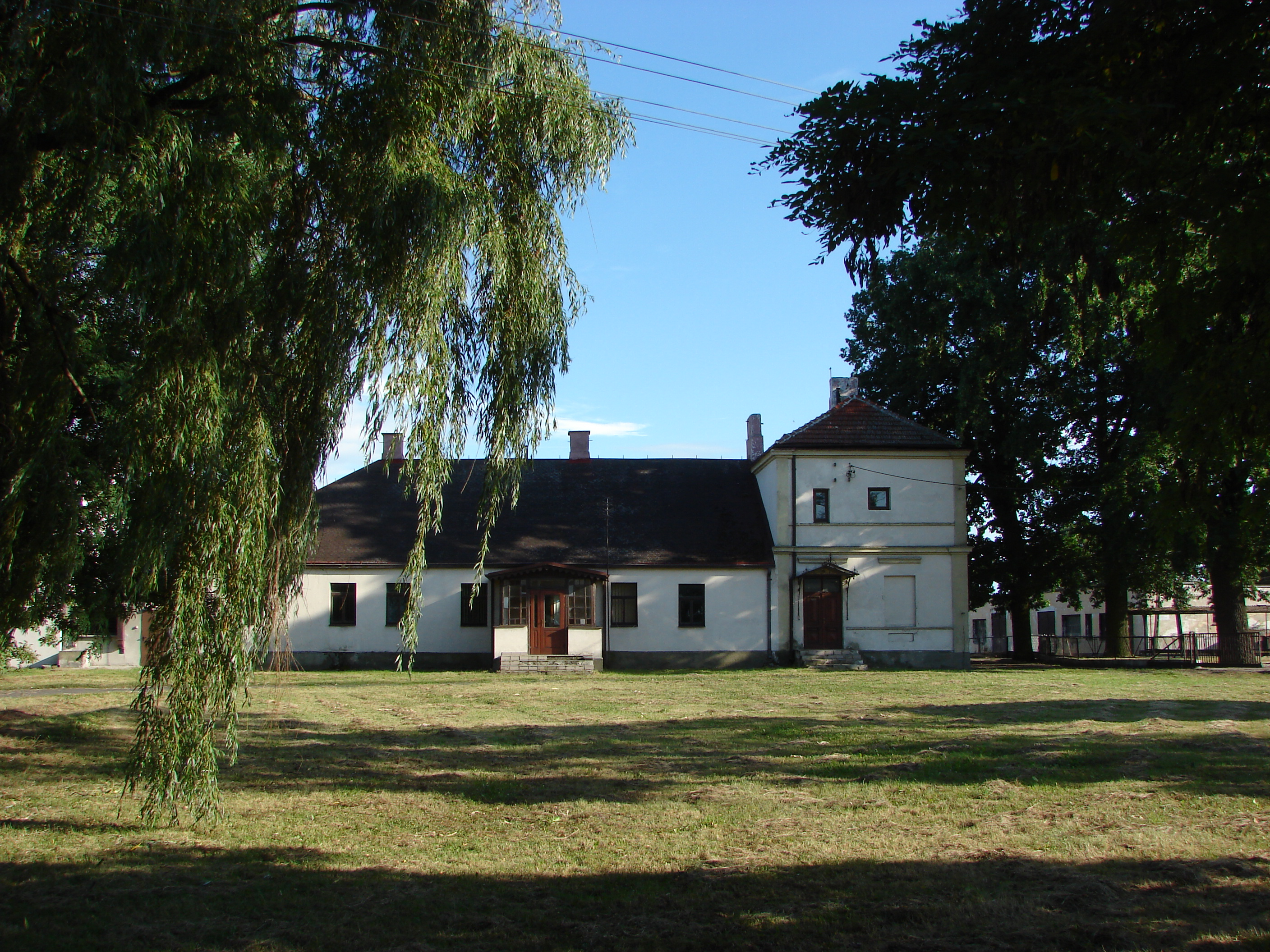
- The manor house. Built in the mid-18th century.

- Location within Poland
- Coordinates: 52°33′25″N 18°58′58″E
- Country: Poland
- Voivodeship: Kuyavian-Pomeranian
- County: Włocławek
- Gmina: Włocławek
- Population: 400

Świętosław (Polish: [ɕfjɛnˈtɔswaf]) is a village in the administrative district of Gmina Włocławek, within Włocławek County, Kuyavian-Pomeranian Voivodeship, in north-central Poland.
