= Nienadowa =

- Village
- Location within Poland
- Coordinates: 49°49′55″N 22°25′57″E
- Country: Poland
- Voivodeship: Subcarpathian
- County: Przemyśl
- Gmina: Dubiecko
- Highest elevation: 400 m (1,300 ft)
- Lowest elevation: 250 m (820 ft)
- Population: 2,500

Nienadowa [ɲɛnaˈdɔva] is a village in the administrative district of Gmina Dubiecko, within Przemyśl County, Subcarpathian Voivodeship, in south-eastern Poland.
