= Ludwinowo, Kuyavian-Pomeranian Voivodeship =

Ludwinowo
- Village
- Location within Poland
- Coordinates: 52°34′13″N 19°00′32″E
- Country: Poland
- Voivodeship: Kuyavian-Pomeranian
- County: Włocławek
- Gmina: Włocławek

Ludwinowo [ludviˈnɔvɔ] is a village in the administrative district of Gmina Włocławek, within Włocławek County, Kuyavian-Pomeranian Voivodeship, in north-central Poland.
