= Zvala =

- Location within Slovakia
- Coordinates: 49°07′47″N 22°14′28″E
- Country: Slovakia
- Region: Prešov Region
- Districts: Snina District

Population (2001)
  - Total: 0
  - Density: 0/km^{2} (0/sq mi)
- Time zone: UTC+1 (CET)
  - Summer (DST): UTC+2 (CEST)

Zvala (Hungarian: Zellő) is a former Ruthenian village in eastern Slovakia, within the Snina District. The first mention of the village was in 1543. The village originally belonged to the noble families of Humenné, later given to some other noble families. The village was destroyed in 1986 to make way for the Starina reservoir, along with six other villages. The only things remaining are the village cemetery and one house. Now the territory lies within Poloniny National Park.
