= Dąb Polski =

- Village
- Location within Poland
- Coordinates: 52°36′N 19°23′E
- Country: Poland
- Voivodeship: Kuyavian-Pomeranian
- County: Włocławek
- Gmina: Włocławek

Dąb Polski [ˈdɔmp ˈpɔlski] is a village in the administrative district of Gmina Włocławek, within Włocławek County, Kuyavian-Pomeranian Voivodeship, in north-central Poland.
