= Pińczata =

- Village
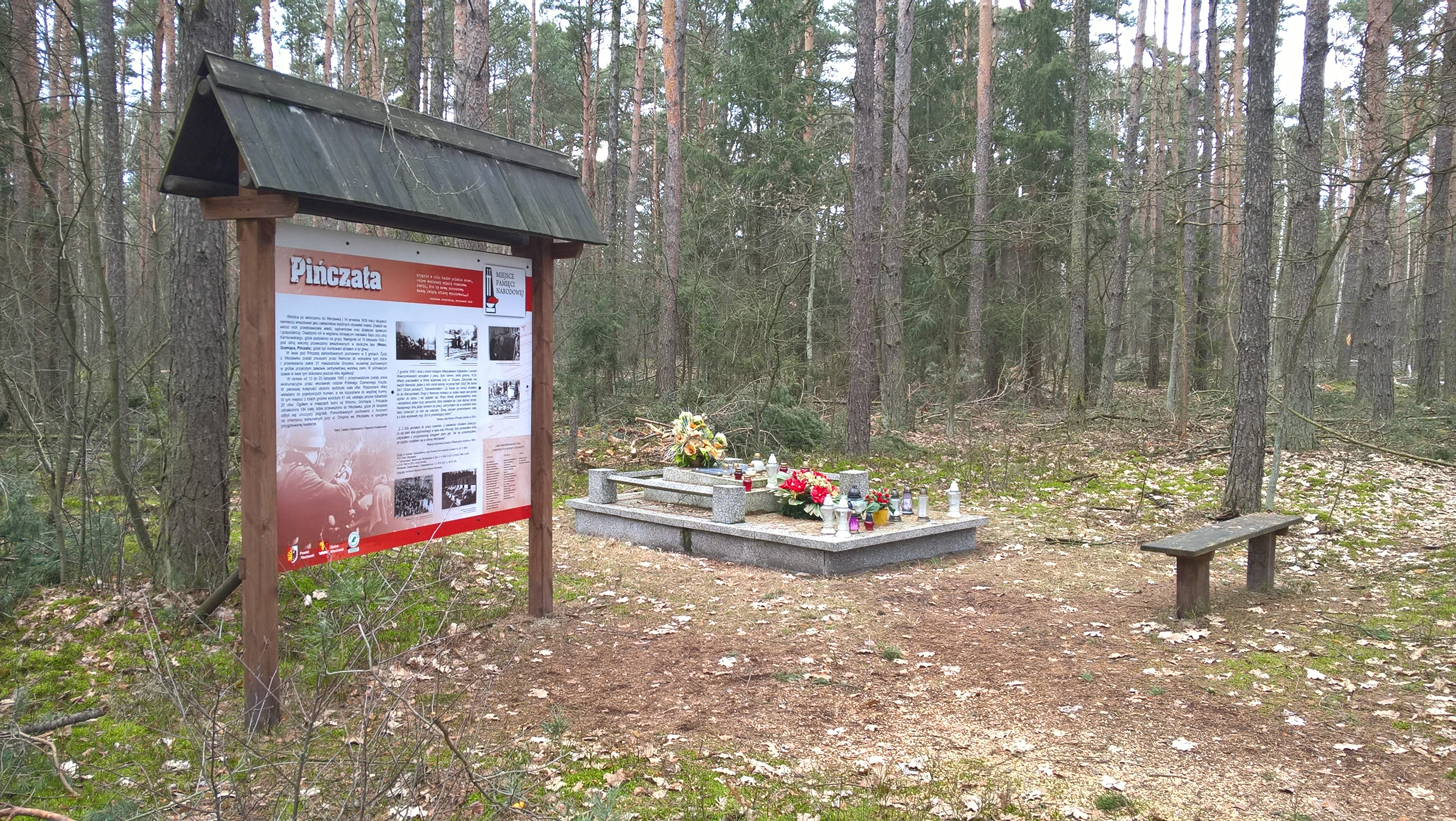
- Memorial at the site of a German massacre of Poles from World War II

- Location within Poland
- Coordinates: 52°36′12″N 19°4′50″E
- Country: Poland
- Voivodeship: Kuyavian-Pomeranian
- County: Włocławek
- Gmina: Włocławek
- Population: 750
- Time zone: UTC+1 (CET)
  - Summer (DST): UTC+2 (CEST)
- Vehicle registration: CWL

Pińczata [piɲˈt͡ʂata] is a village in the administrative district of Gmina Włocławek, within Włocławek County, Kuyavian-Pomeranian Voivodeship, in north-central Poland. It is located within the historic region of Kuyavia.

During the occupation of Poland (World War II), the forest of Pińczata was the site of German massacres of Poles from Włocławek, carried out as part of the Intelligenzaktion.
