= Słonne =

- Village
- Location within Poland
- Coordinates: 49°47′9″N 22°21′2″E
- Country: Poland
- Voivodeship: Subcarpathian
- County: Przemyśl
- Gmina: Dubiecko
- Population: 180

Słonne [ˈswɔnnɛ] is a village in the administrative district of Gmina Dubiecko, within Przemyśl County, Subcarpathian Voivodeship, in south-eastern Poland.
