= Hucisko Nienadowskie =

- Village
- Location within Poland
- Coordinates: 49°53′N 22°26′E
- Country: Poland
- Voivodeship: Subcarpathian
- County: Przemyśl
- Gmina: Dubiecko
- Highest elevation: 450 m (1,480 ft)
- Lowest elevation: 250 m (820 ft)
- Population: 554

Hucisko Nienadowskie [xuˈt͡ɕiskɔ ɲɛnaˈdɔfskʲɛ] is a village in the administrative district of Gmina Dubiecko, within Przemyśl County, Subcarpathian Voivodeship, in south-eastern Poland.
