= Jazy, Kuyavian-Pomeranian Voivodeship =

Jazy
- Village
- Location within Poland
- Coordinates: 52°35′23″N 19°19′15″E
- Country: Poland
- Voivodeship: Kuyavian-Pomeranian
- County: Włocławek
- Gmina: Włocławek

Jazy [ˈjazɨ] is a village in the administrative district of Gmina Włocławek, within Włocławek County, Kuyavian-Pomeranian Voivodeship, in north-central Poland.
