= Tarnawka, Przemyśl County =

Tarnawka
- Village
- Location within Poland
- Coordinates: 49°47′N 22°24′E
- Country: Poland
- Voivodeship: Subcarpathian
- County: Przemyśl
- Gmina: Dubiecko

Tarnawka [tarˈnafka] is a village in the administrative district of Gmina Dubiecko, within Przemyśl County, Subcarpathian Voivodeship, in south-eastern Poland.
