= Załazek Piątkowski =

- Village
- Location within Poland
- Coordinates: 49°45′54″N 22°25′2″E
- Country: Poland
- Voivodeship: Subcarpathian
- County: Przemyśl
- Gmina: Dubiecko
- Population: 100

Załazek Piątkowski [zaˈwazɛk pjɔntˈkɔfski] is a village in the administrative district of Gmina Dubiecko, within Przemyśl County, Subcarpathian Voivodeship, in south-eastern Poland.
