= Winne-Podbukowina =

- Village
- Location within Poland
- Coordinates: 49°49′1″N 22°21′56″E
- Country: Poland
- Voivodeship: Podkarpackie
- County: Przemyśl
- Gmina: Dubiecko
- Population: 274

Winne-Podbukowina [ˈvinnɛ pɔdbukɔˈvina] is a village in the administrative district of Gmina Dubiecko, within Przemyśl County, Podkarpackie Voivodeship, in south-eastern Poland.
