= Dobiegniewo =

- Village
- Location within Poland
- Coordinates: 52°38′N 19°19′E
- Country: Poland
- Voivodeship: Kuyavian-Pomeranian
- County: Włocławek
- Gmina: Włocławek
- Time zone: UTC+1 (CET)
  - Summer (DST): UTC+2 (CEST)
- Vehicle registration: CWL

Dobiegniewo [dɔbjɛɡˈɲɛvɔ] is a village in the administrative district of Gmina Włocławek, within Włocławek County, Kuyavian-Pomeranian Voivodeship, in central Poland.

Dobiegniewo was a royal village, administratively located in the Kowal County in the Brześć Kujawski Voivodeship in the Greater Poland Province of the Kingdom of Poland.
