= Smólnik, Kuyavian-Pomeranian Voivodeship =

Smólnik
- Village
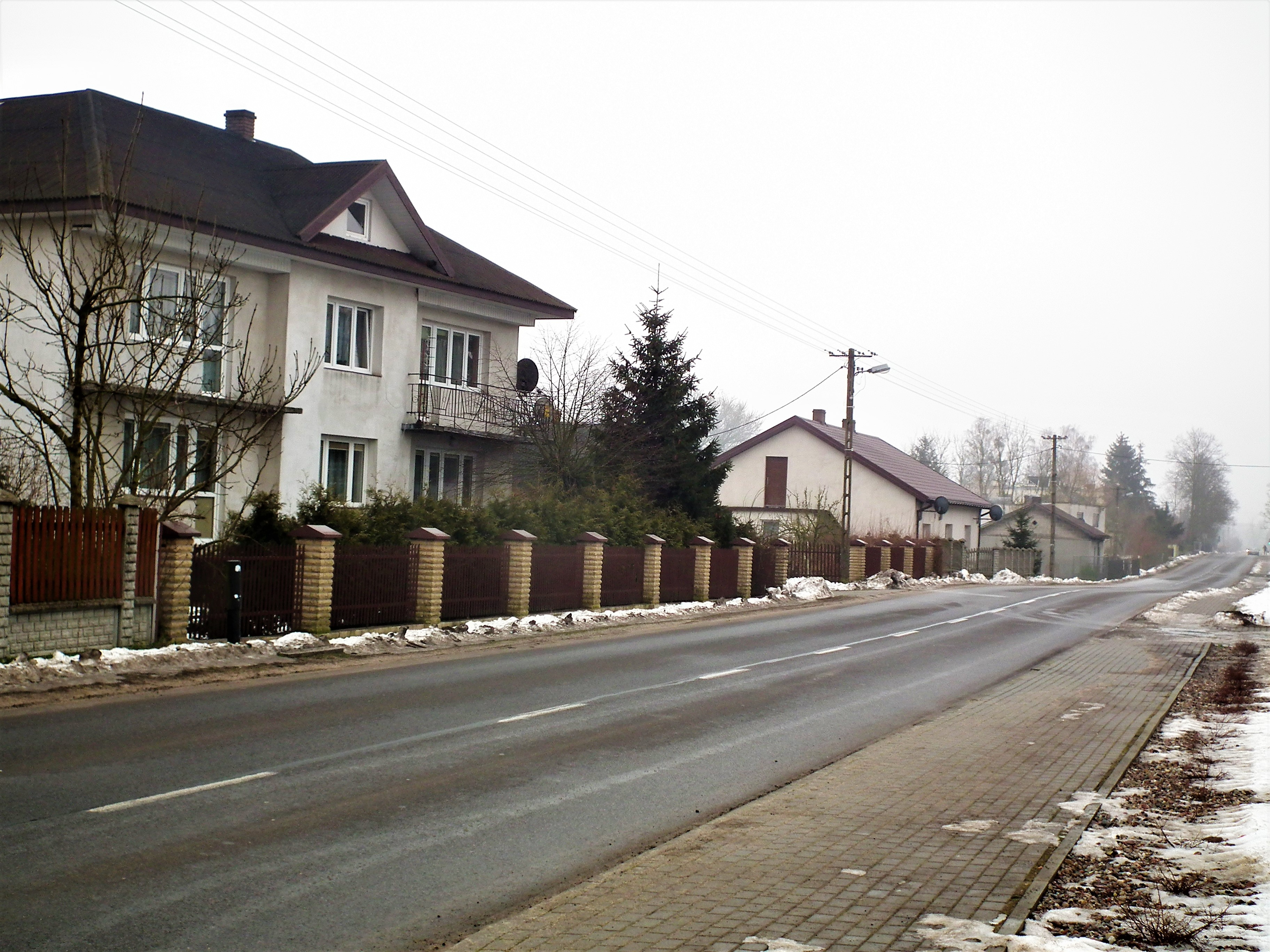

- Location within Poland
- Coordinates: 52°35′53″N 19°15′09″E
- Country: Poland
- Voivodeship: Kuyavian-Pomeranian
- County: Włocławek
- Gmina: Włocławek
- Population: 1,513
- Website: www.gimsmolnik.pl

Smólnik [ˈsmulɲik] is a village in the administrative district of Gmina Włocławek, within Włocławek County, Kuyavian-Pomeranian Voivodeship, in north-central Poland.

== History ==
The area was originally connected to the village of Wistka Szlachecka on the Vistula River. The parish of Wistka Szlachecka was erected around 1494-1496 by Bishop Krzesław Kurozwęk, at a church founded by the local Kretkowski family. In 1489 the villages were mentioned among the villages of the parish of Grabkowo.
