= Płaszczyzna, Kuyavian-Pomeranian Voivodeship =

Płaszczyzna
- Village
- Location within Poland
- Coordinates: 52°34′48″N 19°05′30″E
- Country: Poland
- Voivodeship: Kuyavian-Pomeranian
- County: Włocławek
- Gmina: Włocławek

Płaszczyzna [pwaʂˈt͡ʂɨzna] is a village in the administrative district of Gmina Włocławek, within Włocławek County, Kuyavian-Pomeranian Voivodeship, in north-central Poland.
