= Drohobyczka =

- Village
- Location within Poland
- Coordinates: 49°52′N 22°21′E
- Country: Poland
- Voivodeship: Subcarpathian
- County: Przemyśl
- Gmina: Dubiecko
- Highest elevation: 440 m (1,440 ft)
- Lowest elevation: 250 m (820 ft)
- Population: 1,000
- Website: http://drohobyczka.ovh.org/

Drohobyczka [drɔxɔˈbɨt͡ʂka] is a village in the administrative district of Gmina Dubiecko, within Przemyśl County, Subcarpathian Voivodeship, in south-eastern Poland.
