= Ostrožnica, Snina District =

Ostrožnica
- Location within Slovakia
- Coordinates: 49°03′35″N 22°14′32″E
- Country: Slovakia
- Region: Prešov Region
- Districts: Snina District

Population (2001)
  - Total: 0
  - Density: 0/km^{2} (0/sq mi)
- Time zone: UTC+1 (CET)
  - Summer (DST): UTC+2 (CEST)

Ostrožnica is a former Carpatho-Rusyn village in eastern Slovakia, within Snina District. The first mention of the village was in 1585. The village originally belonged to the noble families of Humenné, later given to some other noble families. The village was destroyed in 1986 to make way for the Starina reservoir, along with six other villages. The only things remaining are a World War I cemetery and the village cemetery. The territory now lies within Poloniny National Park.
