= Potok, Kuyavian-Pomeranian Voivodeship =

Potok
- Village
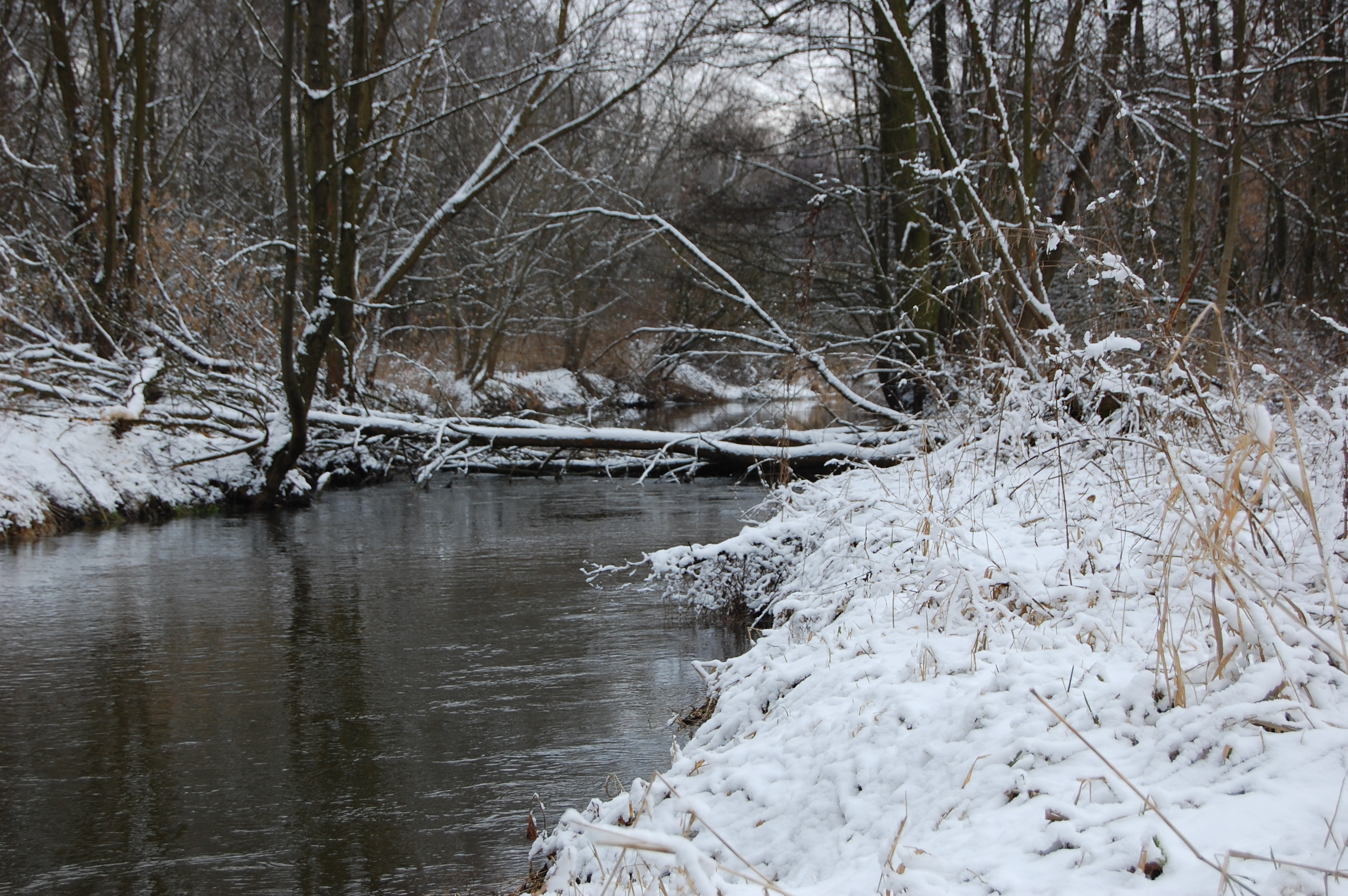
- the Lubienka river in the village of Potok

- Location within Poland
- Coordinates: 52°37′09″N 18°58′40″E
- Country: Poland
- Voivodeship: Kuyavian-Pomeranian
- County: Włocławek
- Gmina: Włocławek

Potok [ˈpɔtɔk] is a village in the administrative district of Gmina Włocławek, within Włocławek County, Kuyavian-Pomeranian Voivodeship, in north-central Poland.
