= Dobra Wola, Kuyavian-Pomeranian Voivodeship =

Dobra Wola
- Village
- Location within Poland
- Coordinates: 52°33′48″N 18°58′50″E
- Country: Poland
- Voivodeship: Kuyavian-Pomeranian
- County: Włocławek
- Gmina: Włocławek

Dobra Wola [ˈdɔbra ˈvɔla] is a village in the administrative district of Gmina Włocławek, within Włocławek County, Kuyavian-Pomeranian Voivodeship, in north-central Poland.
