= Gmina Włocławek =

Gmina Włocławek Włocławek Commune
- Gmina
- Flag Coat of arms
- Interactive map of Gmina Włocławek
- Coordinates (Włocławek): 52°35′50″N 19°10′38″E
- Country: Poland
- Voivodeship: Kuyavian-Pomeranian
- County: Włocławek County
- Seat: Włocławek

Area
  - Total: 219.92 km^{2} (84.91 sq mi)

Population (2006)
  - Total: 6,322
  - Density: 28.75/km^{2} (74.45/sq mi)
- Time zone: UTC+1 (CET)
  - Summer (DST): UTC+2 (CEST)
- Vehicle registration: CWL
- Website: http://www.gmina.wloclawek.pl/

Gmina Włocławek is a rural gmina (administrative district) in Włocławek County, Kuyavian-Pomeranian Voivodeship, in central Poland. Its seat is the city of Włocławek, although the city is not part of the territory of the gmina.

The gmina covers an area of 219.92 square kilometres (84.9 sq mi), and as of 2006 its total population is 6,322.

The gmina contains part of the protected area called Gostynin-Włocławek Landscape Park.

== Villages ==
Gmina Włocławek contains the villages and settlements of Adaminowo, Dąb Mały, Dąb Polski, Dąb Wielki, Dębice, Dobiegniewo, Dobra Wola, Gróbce, Humlin, Jazy, Józefowo, Kolonia Dębice, Kosinowo, Koszanowo, Kruszyn, Kruszynek, Łączki, Ładne, Łagiewniki, Łuba Druga, Ludwinowo, Markowo, Modzerowo, Mostki, Mursk, Nowa Wieś, Pińczata, Płaszczyzna, Poddębice, Potok, Przerytka, Przyruda, Radyszyn, Ruda, Skoki Duże, Skoki Małe, Smolarka, Smolarskie, Smólnik, Smólsk, Stasin, Świętosław, Sykuła, Telążna Leśna, Telążna Stara, Warząchewka Królewska, Warząchewka Nowa, Warząchewka Polska, Widoń, Wikaryjskie, Wistka Królewska, Wistka Szlachecka, Wójtowskie and Zuzałka.

== Neighbouring gminas ==
Gmina Włocławek is bordered by the town of Włocławek and by the gminas of Baruchowo, Brudzeń Duży, Brześć Kujawski, Choceń, Dobrzyń nad Wisłą, Kowal, Lubraniec and Nowy Duninów.
