= Stasin, Kuyavian-Pomeranian Voivodeship =

Stasin
- Village
- Location within Poland
- Coordinates: 52°36′51″N 19°16′59″E
- Country: Poland
- Voivodeship: Kuyavian-Pomeranian
- County: Włocławek
- Gmina: Włocławek
- Time zone: UTC+1 (CET)
  - Summer (DST): UTC+2 (CEST)

Stasin [ˈstaɕin] is a village in the administrative district of Gmina Włocławek, within Włocławek County, Kuyavian-Pomeranian Voivodeship, in central Poland.
