= Skoki Duże =

- Village
- Location within Poland
- Coordinates: 52°37′N 19°24′E
- Country: Poland
- Voivodeship: Kuyavian-Pomeranian
- County: Włocławek
- Gmina: Włocławek

Skoki Duże [ˈskɔki ˈduʐɛ] is a village in the administrative district of Gmina Włocławek, within Włocławek County, Kuyavian-Pomeranian Voivodeship, in north-central Poland.
