= Gmina Dubiecko =

Gmina Dubiecko Dubiecko Commune
- Gmina
- Coat of arms
- Interactive map of Gmina Dubiecko
- Coordinates (Dubiecko): 49°49′32″N 22°23′24″E
- Country: Poland
- Voivodeship: Subcarpathian
- County: Przemyśl County
- Seat: Dubiecko

Area
  - Total: 154.26 km^{2} (59.56 sq mi)

Population (2013)
  - Total: 9,432
  - Density: 61.14/km^{2} (158.4/sq mi)
- Website: https://web.archive.org/web/20080106172633/http://www.dubiecko.itl.pl/

Gmina Dubiecko is a rural gmina (administrative district) in Przemyśl County, Subcarpathian Voivodeship, in south-eastern Poland. Its seat is the village of Dubiecko, which lies approximately 28 kilometres (17 mi) west of Przemyśl and 36 km (22 mi) south-east of the regional capital Rzeszów.

The gmina covers an area of 154.26 square kilometres (59.6 sq mi), and as of 2006 its total population is 9,590 (9,432 in 2013).

The gmina contains part of the protected area called Pogórze Przemyskie Landscape Park.

== Villages ==
Gmina Dubiecko contains the villages and settlements of Bachórzec, Drohobyczka, Dubiecko, Hucisko Nienadowskie, Iskań, Kosztowa, Łączki, Nienadowa, Piątkowa, Przedmieście Dubieckie, Sielnica, Śliwnica, Słonne, Tarnawka, Winne-Podbukowina, Wybrzeże and Załazek Piątkowski.

== Neighbouring gminas ==
Gmina Dubiecko is bordered by the gminas of Bircza, Dynów, Jawornik Polski, Kańczuga, Krzywcza and Pruchnik.
