= Wybrzeże, Podkarpackie Voivodeship =

Wybrzeże
- Village
- Location within Poland
- Coordinates: 49°48′28″N 22°23′10″E
- Country: Poland
- Voivodeship: Subcarpathian
- County: Przemyśl
- Gmina: Dubiecko

Wybrzeże [vɨˈbʐɛʐɛ] is a village in the administrative district of Gmina Dubiecko, within Przemyśl County, Subcarpathian Voivodeship, in south-eastern Poland.
