= Telążna Leśna =

- Village

- Location within Poland
- Coordinates: 52°35′N 19°16′E
- Country: Poland
- Voivodeship: Kuyavian-Pomeranian
- County: Włocławek
- Gmina: Włocławek
- Time zone: UTC+1 (CET)
  - Summer (DST): UTC+2 (CEST)
- Vehicle registration: CWL

Telążna Leśna [tɛˈlɔ̃ʐna ˈlɛɕna] is a village in the administrative district of Gmina Włocławek, within Włocławek County, Kuyavian-Pomeranian Voivodeship, in central Poland.

Three Polish citizens were murdered by Nazi Germany in the village during World War II.
