= Przedmieście Dubieckie =

- Village
- Location within Poland
- Coordinates: 49°51′N 22°22′E
- Country: Poland
- Voivodeship: Subcarpathian
- County: Przemyśl
- Gmina: Dubiecko
- Population: 1,100

Przedmieście Dubieckie [pʂɛdˈmjɛɕt͡ɕɛ duˈbjɛt͡skʲɛ] is a village in the administrative district of Gmina Dubiecko, within Przemyśl County, Subcarpathian Voivodeship, in south-eastern Poland.
