= Bachórzec =

- Village
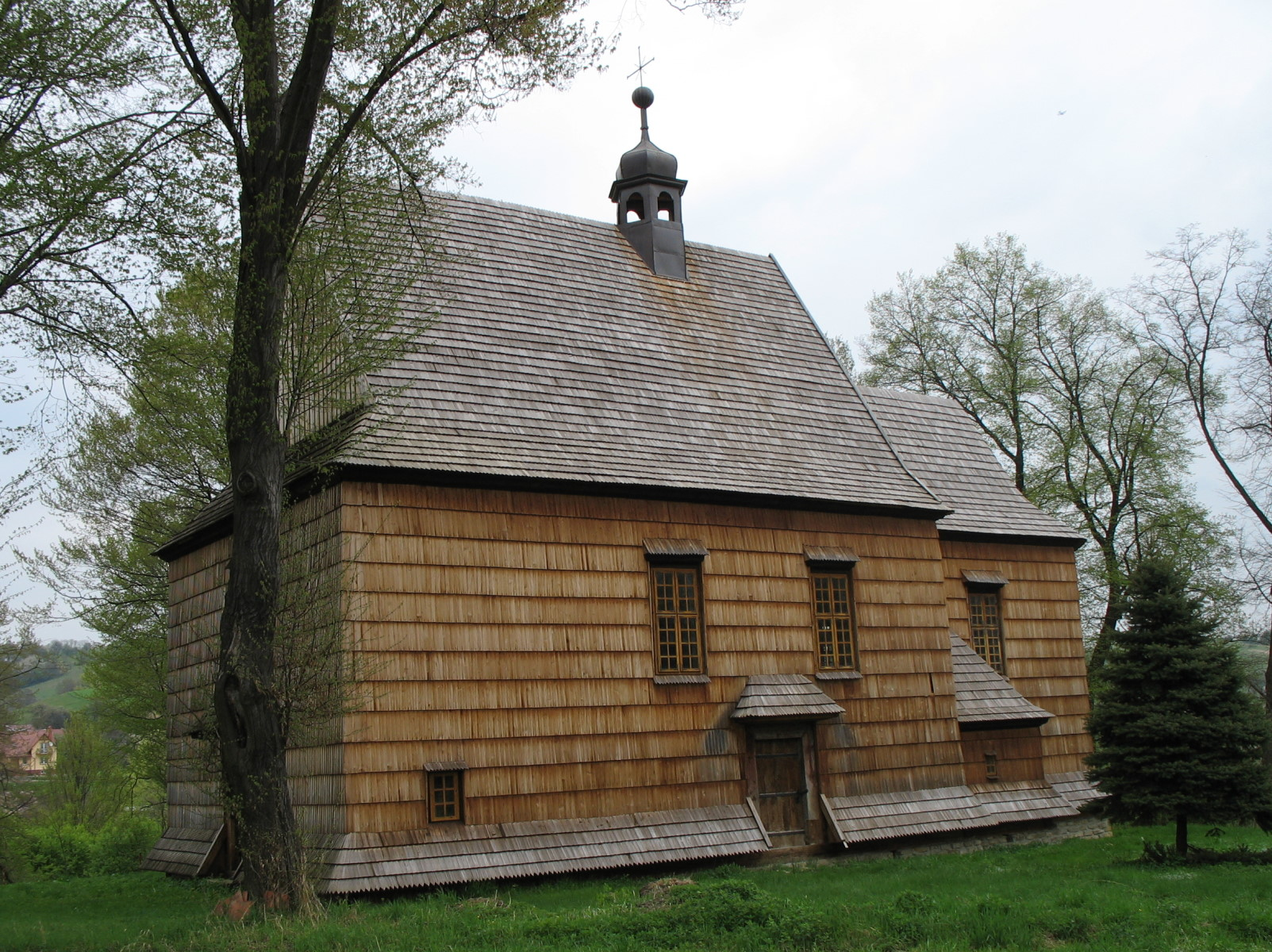
- Wooden church

- Location within Poland
- Coordinates: 49°50′N 22°20′E
- Country: Poland
- Voivodeship: Subcarpathian
- County: Przemyśl
- Gmina: Dubiecko
- Population: 950

Bachórzec [baˈxuʐɛt͡s] is a village in the administrative district of Gmina Dubiecko, within Przemyśl County, Subcarpathian Voivodeship, in south-eastern Poland.
