= Wistka Szlachecka =

- Village
- Location within Poland
- Coordinates: 52°37′9″N 19°17′38″E
- Country: Poland
- Voivodeship: Kuyavian-Pomeranian
- County: Włocławek
- Gmina: Włocławek

Wistka Szlachecka [ˈvistka ʂlaˈxɛt͡ska] is a village in the administrative district of Gmina Włocławek, within Włocławek County, Kuyavian-Pomeranian Voivodeship, in north-central Poland.
