= Starina, Snina District =

Starina
- Location within Slovakia
- Coordinates: 49°03′10″N 22°15′43″E
- Country: Slovakia
- Region: Prešov Region
- District: Snina District

Population (2024)
  - Total: 0
  - Density: 0/km^{2} (0/sq mi)
- Time zone: UTC+1 (CET)
  - Summer (DST): UTC+2 (CEST)

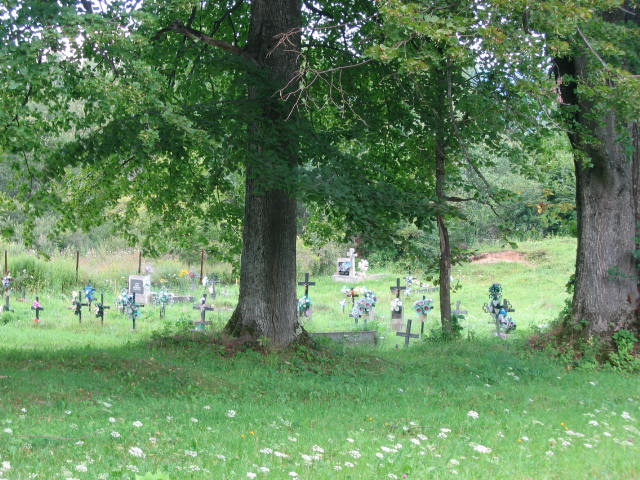

Starina (Hungarian: Cirókaófalu) is a former Ruthenian village in eastern Slovakia, within Snina District. The first mention of the village was in 1557. The village originally belonged to the noble families of Humenné. The inhabitants of the village were evacuated in 1980, along with six other villages, in order to make way for the Starina reservoir. Only one building and the cemetery remain. The village is now under the water level of the dam. Below the Magura mountain is a mineral water source. Now the territory is in the Poloniny National Park. On the territory, there is also the Gazdoráň Nature Reserve, which was declared for the protection of rare plants.
