= Łączki, Kuyavian-Pomeranian Voivodeship =

Łączki
- Village
- Location within Poland
- Coordinates: 52°36′09″N 19°15′56″E
- Country: Poland
- Voivodeship: Kuyavian-Pomeranian
- County: Włocławek
- Gmina: Włocławek

Łączki [ˈwɔnt͡ʂki] is a village in the administrative district of Gmina Włocławek, within Włocławek County, Kuyavian-Pomeranian Voivodeship, in north-central Poland.
