= Sielnica, Poland =

Sielnica
- Village
- Location within Poland
- Coordinates: 49°48′N 22°19′E
- Country: Poland
- Voivodeship: Subcarpathian
- County: Przemyśl
- Gmina: Dubiecko
- Population: 770

Sielnica [ɕɛlˈnit͡sa] is a village in the administrative district of Gmina Dubiecko, within Przemyśl County, Subcarpathian Voivodeship, in south-eastern Poland.
