= Starina reservoir =

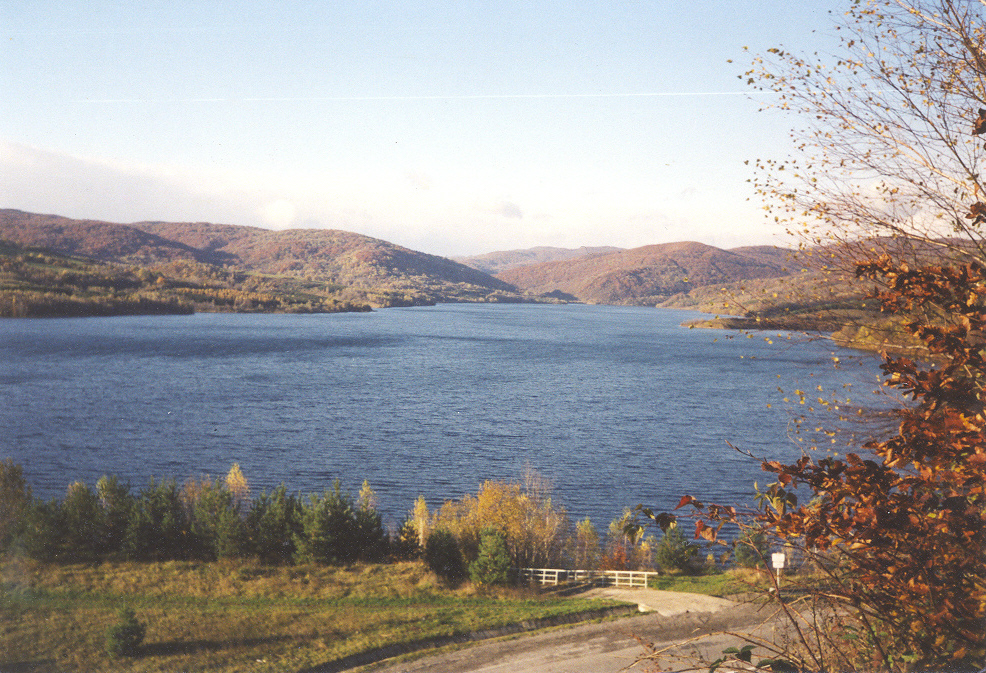

- Location within Slovakia
- Coordinates: 49°03′29″N 22°15′28″E
- Type: reservoir
- Basin countries: Slovakia

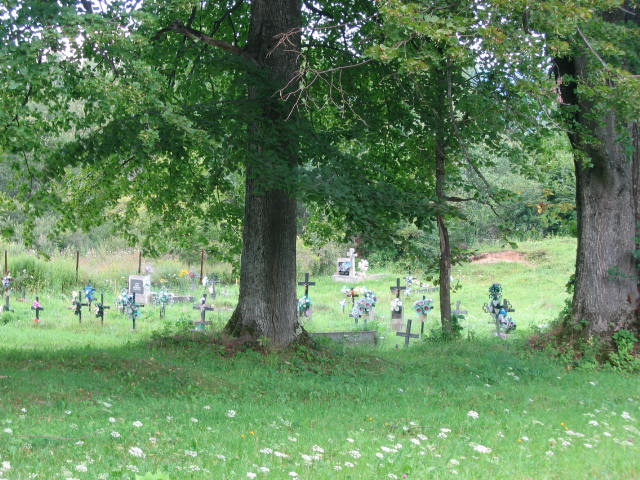
The abandoned village of Ruské near the Starina water reservoir.

Starina reservoir is a water reservoir in eastern Slovakia, Snina District, located in the Poloniny National Park. It is the most important source of drinking water in the area, built on the headwaters of the river Cirocha. Building started in 1981. 3,463 inhabitants were evacuated from 769 dwellings from the 7 following villages (Starina, Dara, Ostrožnica, Smolník, Ruské, Veľká Poľana and Zvala). The total surface of the water reservoir Starina is 240 ha. The height of the water headbay is 50 m. This source of drinking water is very important because it supplies nearly all of East Slovakia with drinking water. There is a scenic viewpoint above the water reservoir Starina.
