= Łączki, Przemyśl County =

Łączki
- Village
- Location within Poland
- Coordinates: 49°46′36″N 22°20′27″E
- Country: Poland
- Voivodeship: Subcarpathian
- County: Przemyśl
- Gmina: Dubiecko

Łączki [ˈwɔnt͡ʂki] is a village in the administrative district of Gmina Dubiecko, within Przemyśl County, Subcarpathian Voivodeship, in south-eastern Poland.
