= Starina, Zenica =

Starina
- Village
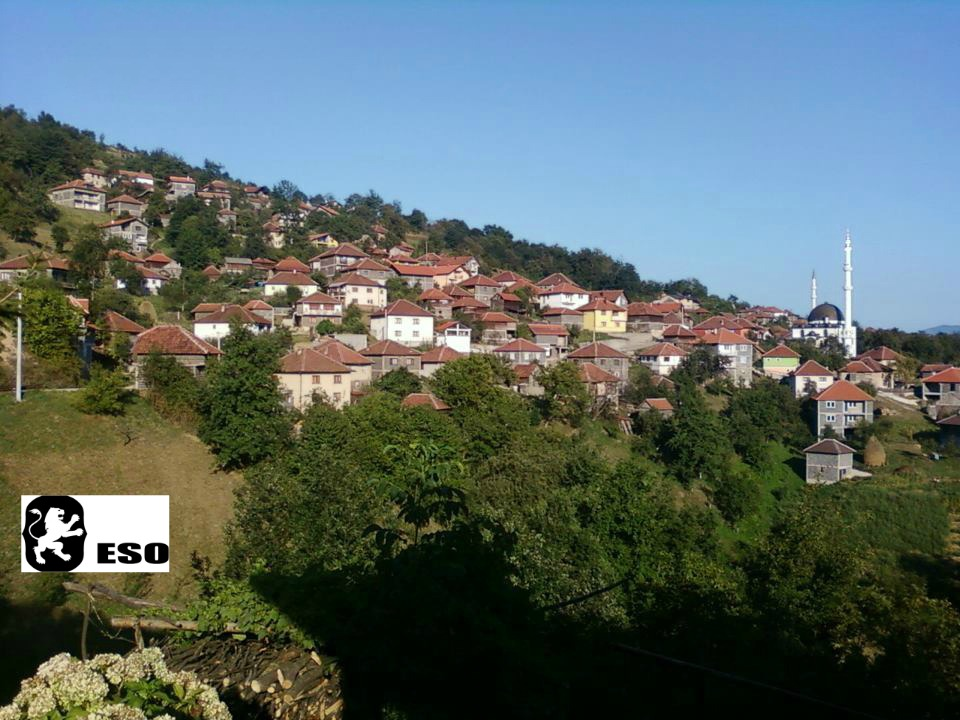

- Location within Bosnia and Herzegovina
- Coordinates: 44.3678945°N 17.9081074°E
- Country: Bosnia and Herzegovina
- Entity: Federation of Bosnia and Herzegovina
- Canton: Zenica-Doboj
- Municipality: Zenica

Area
  - Total: 1.58 sq mi (4.09 km^{2})

Population (2013)
  - Total: 787
  - Density: 498/sq mi (192/km^{2})
- Time zone: UTC+1 (CET)
  - Summer (DST): UTC+2 (CEST)

Starina is a village in the City of Zenica, Bosnia and Herzegovina.

== Demographics ==
According to the 2013 census, its population was 787.

Ethnicity in 2013
Ethnicity	Number	Percentage
Bosniaks	786	99.9%
other/undeclared	1	0.1%
Total	787	100%
