= Małgorzata Łupina =

- Born: 17 October 1969 (age 55); Łódź, Poland
- Occupation(s): Film director, cameraman, producer, screenwriter

Małgorzata Łupina (born 17 October 1969 in Olsztyn) is a Polish documentary film director and cameraman. She graduated from the National Film School in Łódź (PWSFTViT) in 1995.

== Selected filmography ==
- 2010 - Zapaśniczka z Boliwii - director, producer
- 2006 - Dudi (also an animated sequence Dłuży się doży) - director, script, photography
- 2002 - O czym marzą tygrysy - photography
- 2002 - Marzyć każdy może - director, script, photography
- 2002 - Himilsbach. Prawdy, bujdy, czarne dziury - director
- 1997 - Kirk Douglas. 30 lat później - photography
- 1995 - Viola... Viola - director, script, photography
- 1995 - Kotek - photography
