= Dębice, Kuyavian-Pomeranian Voivodeship =

Dębice
- Village
- Location within Poland
- Coordinates: 52°34′11″N 19°1′23″E
- Country: Poland
- Voivodeship: Kuyavian-Pomeranian
- County: Włocławek
- Gmina: Włocławek
- Population: 140

Dębice [dɛmˈbit͡sɛ] is a village in the administrative district of Gmina Włocławek, within Włocławek County, Kuyavian-Pomeranian Voivodeship, in north-central Poland.
