= Smolník, Snina District =

Smolník
- Location within Slovakia
- Coordinates: 49°03′33″N 22°15′05″E
- Country: Slovakia
- Region: Prešov Region
- Districts: Snina District

Population (2001)
  - Total: 0
  - Density: 0/km^{2} (0/sq mi)
- Time zone: UTC+1 (CET)
  - Summer (DST): UTC+2 (CEST)

Smolník (Hungarian: Újszomolnok) was a Ruthenian village in eastern Slovakia, within Snina District. The first mention of the village was in 1568. In 1980, the village was destroyed, along with six other villages, to make way for the Starina reservoir. Before its destruction, it had 72 houses and approximately 360 people. The village originally belonged to the noble families of Humenné, which was later given to some other noble families. There remains a cemetery of people killed during World War I and a bell tower. The territory is within Poloniny National Park.
