= Nowa Wieś, Gmina Włocławek =

Nowa Wieś
- Village
- Location within Poland
- Coordinates: 52°35′21″N 19°0′7″E
- Country: Poland
- Voivodeship: Kuyavian-Pomeranian
- County: Włocławek
- Gmina: Włocławek
- Population: 258

Nowa Wieś [ˈnɔva ˈvjɛɕ] is a village in the administrative district of Gmina Włocławek, within Włocławek County, Kuyavian-Pomeranian Voivodeship, in north-central Poland.
