= Włocławek =

City in Kuyavian-Pomeranian, Poland

- City county
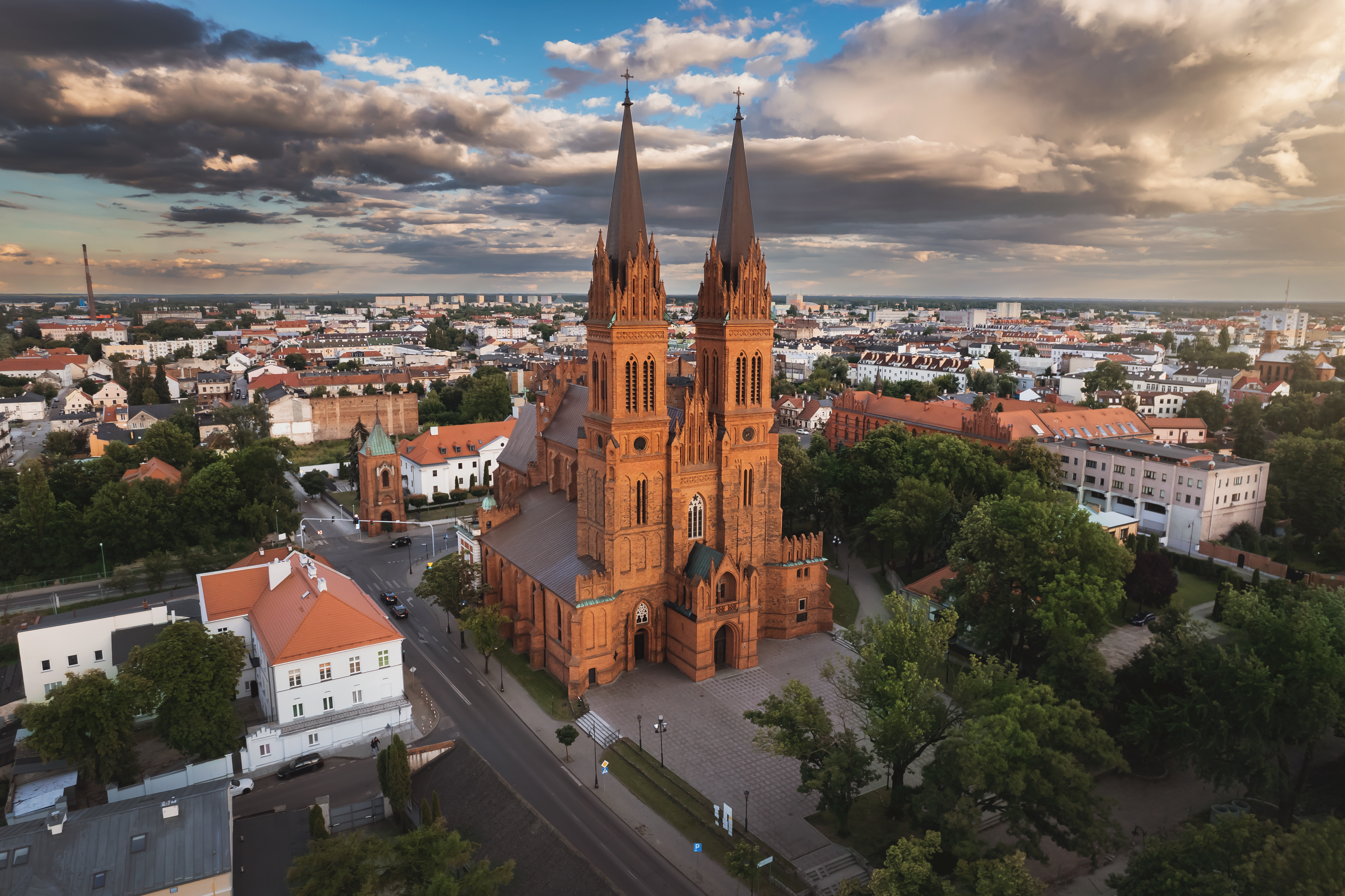
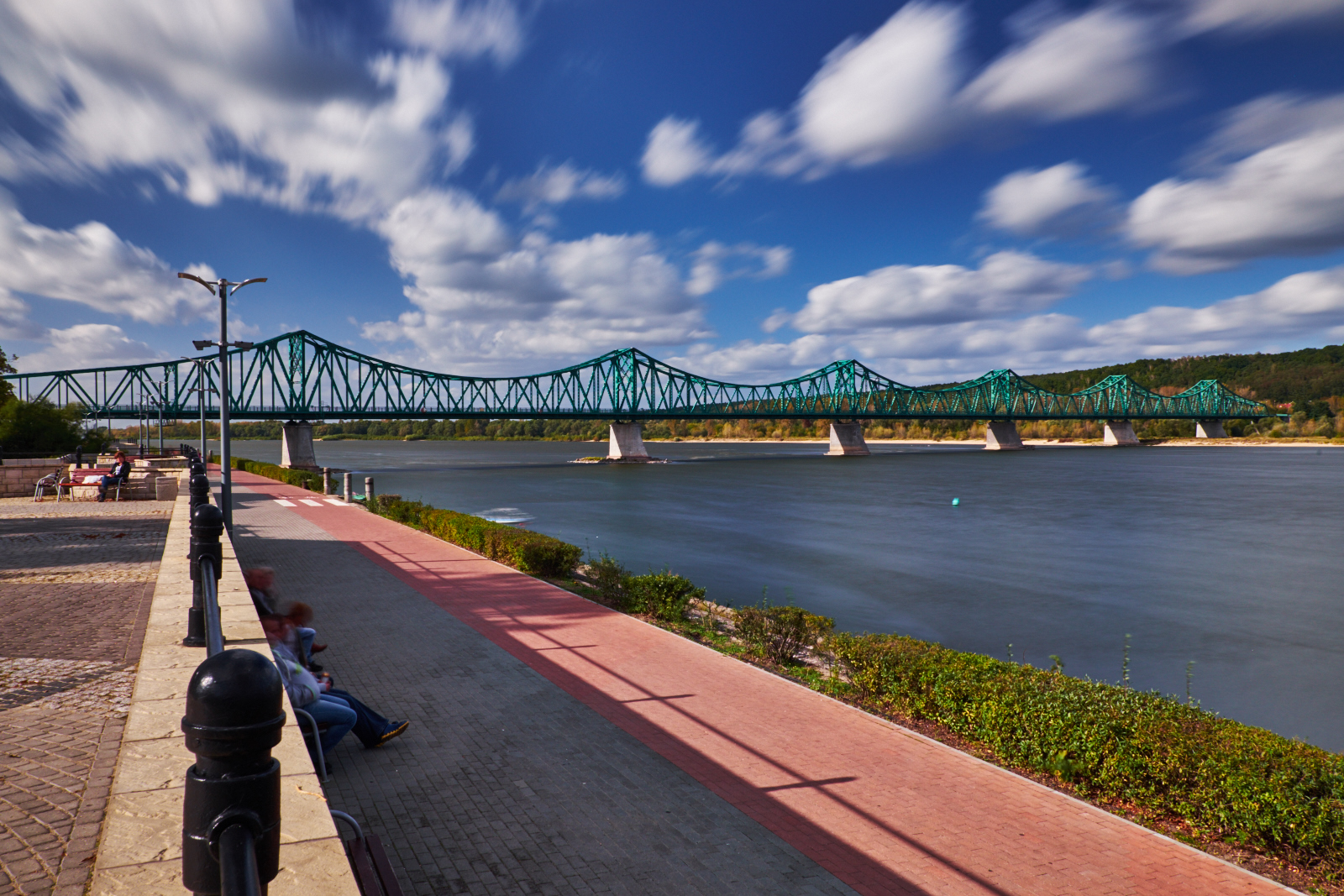
- Aerial view with the Włocławek Cathedral Old Market Square and Saint John the Baptist church Piłsudski Boulevards and Śmigły-Rydz Bridge

- Flag Coat of arms

- Location within Poland
- Coordinates: 52°39′33″N 19°04′05″E
- Country: Poland
- Voivodeship: Kuyavian-Pomeranian
- Powiat: city county
- Established: 9th century
- First mentioned: 12th century
- City rights: 1255

Government
  - Mayor: Krzysztof Kukucki (L)

Area
  - City county: 84.32 km^{2} (32.56 sq mi)

Population (31 December 2021)
  - City county: 106,928 ▼ (34th)
  - Metro: 210,516(2005)
- Time zone: UTC+01:00 (CET)
  - Summer (DST): UTC+02:00 (CEST)
- Postal code: 87-800 to 87-810, 87-812, 87-814, 87-816 to 87-818, 87-822
- Area code: +48 54
- Car plates: CW
- Website: www.wloclawek.pl

Włocławek (Note: Polish: [vwɔˈt͡swavɛk]; German: Leslau or Alt Lesle; Yiddish: וולאָצלאַוועק, romanized: Vlatzlavek; Russian: Влоцлавек, romanized: Vlotslavek.) is a city in the Kuyavian–Pomeranian Voivodeship in central Poland along the Vistula River, bordered by the Gostynin-Włocławek Landscape Park. As of December 2021, the population of the city is 106,928.

Founded in the 9th century, Włocławek is located in the historical region of Kuyavia, and was its administrative center and main city in the Middle Ages. Nowadays, Włocławek is the third largest city of the Kuyavian-Pomeranian Voivodeship (after Bydgoszcz and Toruń) and the main cultural and economic center of eastern Kuyavia. It is the seat of the Roman Catholic Diocese of Włocławek, one of the oldest dioceses in Poland, since the 12th century, with the landmark Gothic Włocławek Cathedral listed as a Historic Monument of Poland. Poland's largest hydroelectric power plant is also located there. Włocławek is also a prominent centre for the production of faience and ketchup in Poland. It is home to several museums and the successful basketball club Anwil Włocławek.

== History ==
Włocławek's history dates back to the late Bronze Age – early Iron Age (1300 BCE – 500 BCE). Archaeological excavations conducted on the current city site uncovered the remains of a settlement belonging to the Lusatian culture, as well as evidence of a settlement of early Pomeranian culture which had been established. Traces of additional settlements dating to the Roman period and the early Middle Ages have also been excavated in the area.

=== Middle Ages ===
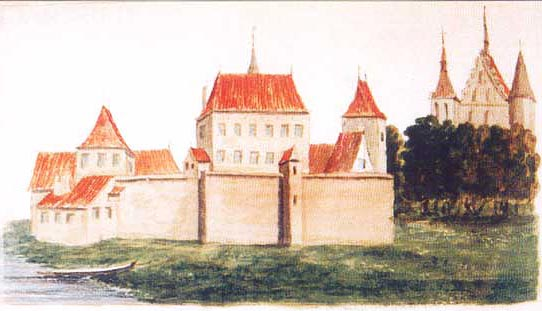
17th-century drawing of the medieval castle in Włocławek

The settlement was founded in the 9th century and its early inhabitants were occupied with agriculture and crafts. In the 10th century it became part of the emerging Polish state under the Piast dynasty. Already under the rule of Bolesław I the Brave it was one of Poland's most important administrative centers, as mentioned in the Gesta principum Polonorum chronicle from the 1110s, which also happens to be the oldest known mention of the city. The name is derived from the Old Polish male name Włodzisław, possibly the founder of Włocławek. In the mid-10th century, under Casimir I the Restorer, Włocławek was the seat of a castellany and the administrative center of Kuyavia.

One of the earliest references to the town came from an assistant to the Archbishop of Gniezno who was noted as residing in the town in 1123. Later the Diocese of Włocławek (Latin: Vladislaviensis) of Kuyavia in 1148, notates its existence in a bull issued by Pope Eugene III, while mentioning the first bishop of Włocławek as Warner. Warner was followed by an Italian, Onoldius; the diocese was recorded as "Włocławek and Pomerania" (Vladislaviensis et Pomeraniae).

In the 12th century, there was a mint and a customs chamber, where tolls were collected from ships and boats sailing on the Vistula and Zgłowiączka rivers. A hospital was founded at the turn of the 12th and 13th centuries, whereas the local school was first mentioned in 1215.

Włocławek received its city rights in 1255. During the 14th and 15th centuries, the city was destroyed and captured several times by the Teutonic Knights and renamed it Leslau. The Treaty of Thorn, signed in 1411, resulted in short-lived peace for the city, however, it prospered from its involvement in the ransoming of the captured Teutonic Knights which was payable in three instalments and proved to be a hardship on the Prussian faction. Włocławek was located within the Brześć Kujawski Voivodeship of the Greater Poland Province. There is a possibility that Nicolaus Copernicus, the later renowned astronomer, may have attended the local cathedral school in the late 15th century.

=== Modern era ===
The city's prosperity came from river transport of grain from Kuyavia, the collection of tolls on grain floated from the more southern part of Poland to the country's main port of Gdańsk, transport of timber from the Narew, Bug and upper Vistula rivers for export to Western Europe and brewing. This is mentioned in the 1595 poem Flis, to jest Spuszczanie statków Wisłą i inszymi rzekami do niej przypadającymi by Sebastian Klonowic.

In 1569, Bishop Stanisław Karnkowski founded a theological seminary in Włocławek, one of the oldest seminaries in Poland. In 1625, the Reformed Franciscans were brought to Włocławek by Bishop Andrzej Lipski, and soon their Baroque monastery was built.

The city was ravaged by the Swedes during the Swedish invasion of Poland in 1657 and by the Russians during the Great Northern War in 1707. In 1790, Polish national hero Tadeusz Kościuszko stayed in Włocławek.

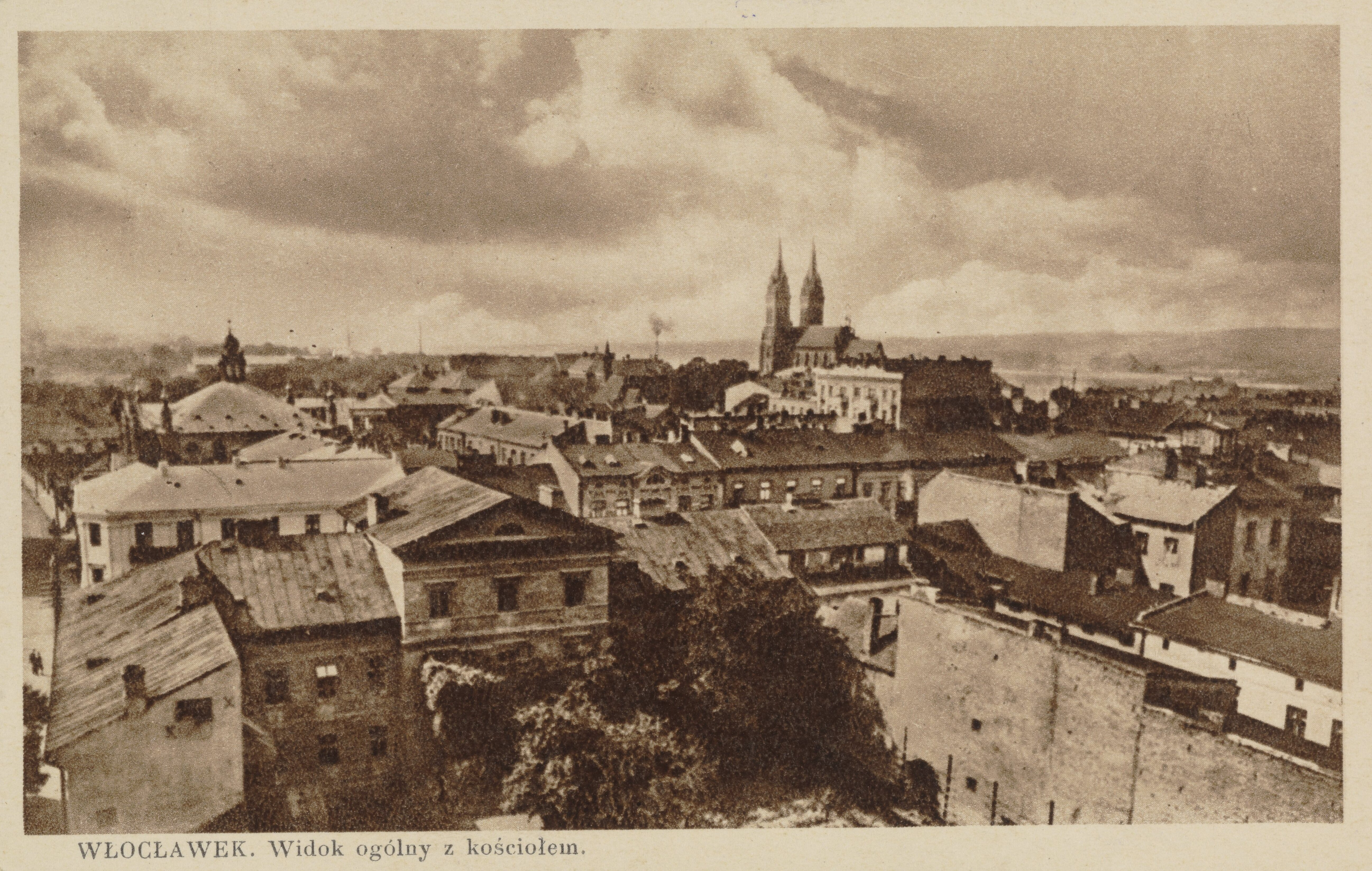
Włocławek in the interbellum

After the Second Partition of Poland of 1793, Włocławek became part of Prussia. It was the site of Polish resistance during the Kościuszko Uprising of 1794, when Dionizy Mniewski sank Prussian ships with ammunition headed for besieged Warsaw. After the Treaties of Tilsit in 1807 it became part of the Polish short-lived Duchy of Warsaw. Subsequently, after the Congress of Vienna it became part of Congress Kingdom of Poland in the Russian Partition of Poland in 1815. Polish insurgents operated in the city and in its vicinity during the January Uprising of 1863–1864. The insurgents clashed with Russian troops in Włocławek on November 8, 1863, and February 17, 1864. The first faience factory in Włocławek was founded in 1873. The oldest Polish theological journal Ateneum Kapłańskie has been published in Włocławek since 1909. The city was again destroyed during the battles of German offensive during the First World War.

When Poland declared independence in 1918, local Poles disarmed the Germans and liberated the city. In 1920, Poles successfully defended the city against the invading Soviets during the Polish–Soviet War.

=== World War II ===
Memorials to the victims of the German occupation in Włocławek (examples):

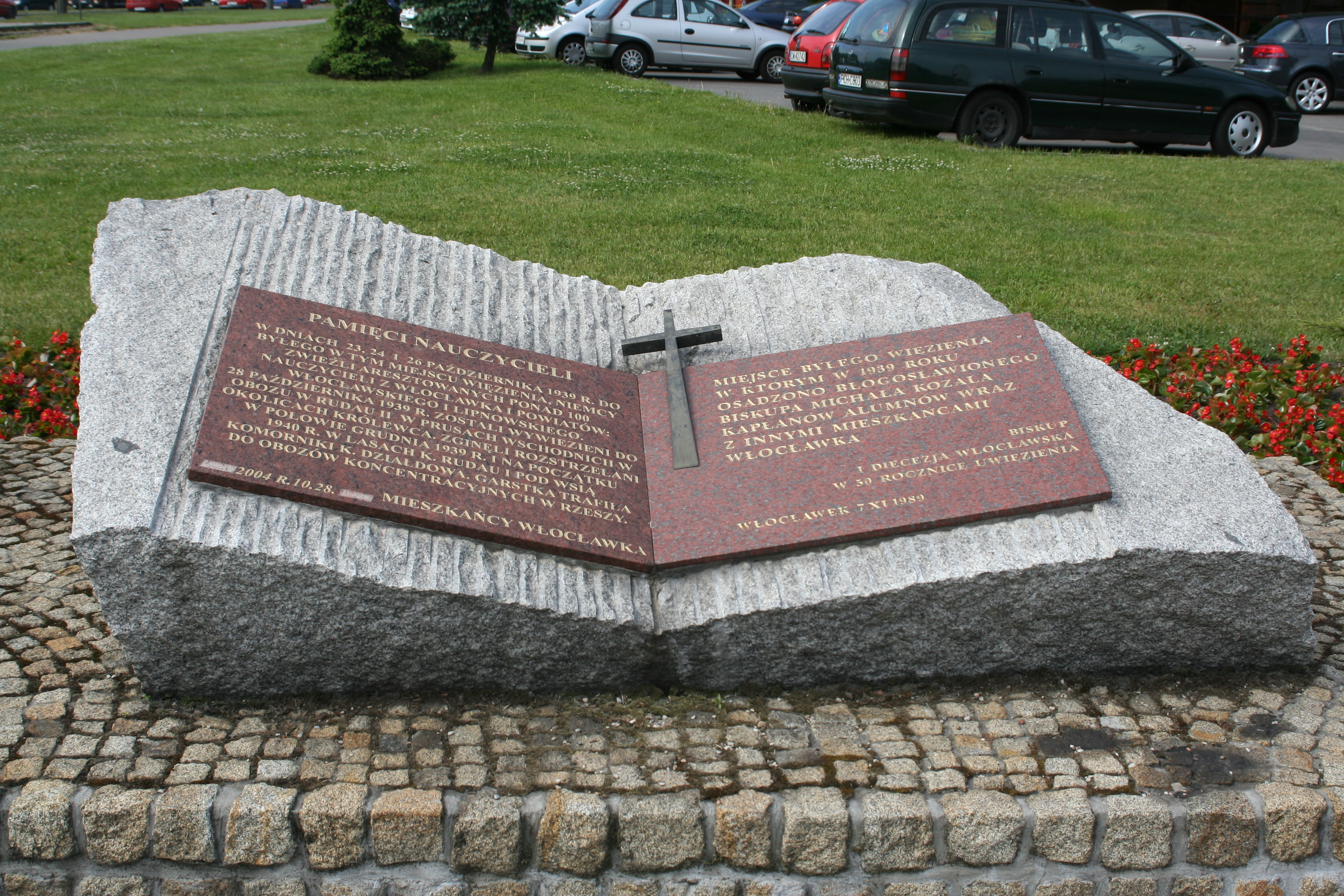
Memorial at the site where Germans imprisoned Polish teachers and priests in 1939

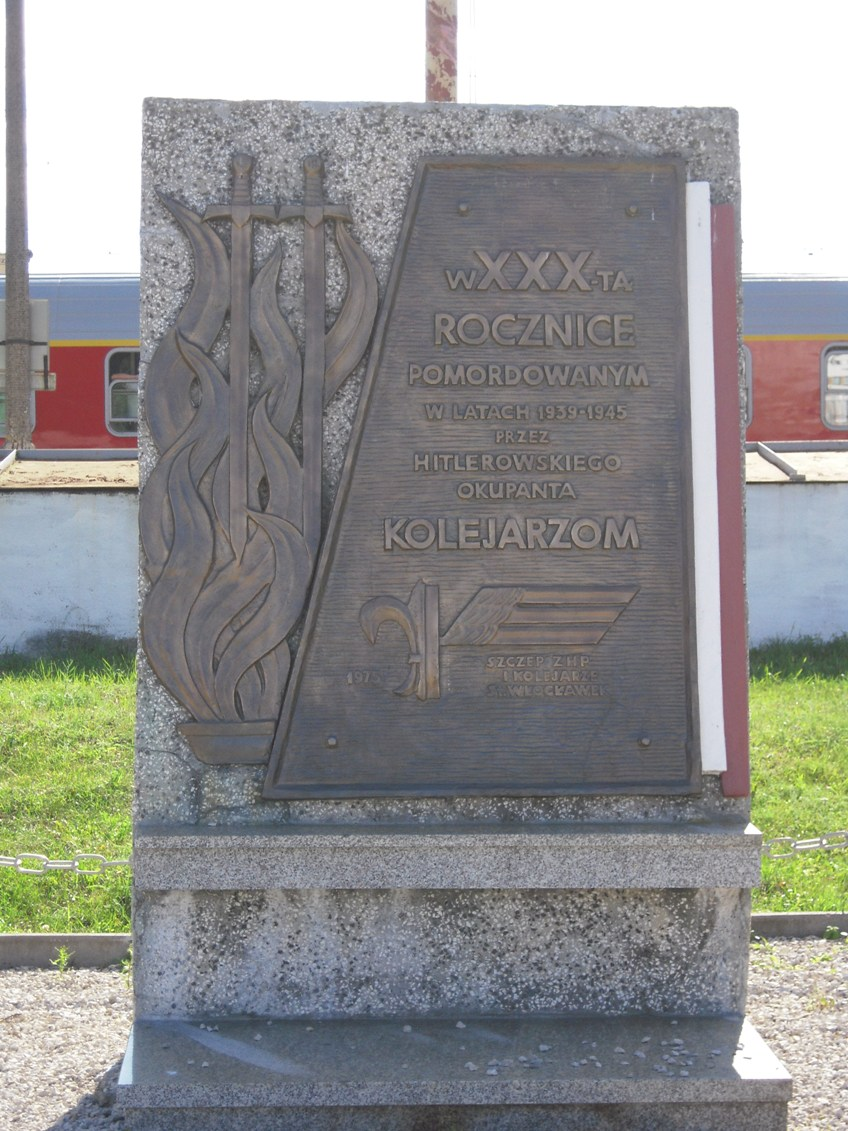
Memorial to murdered Polish railwaymen

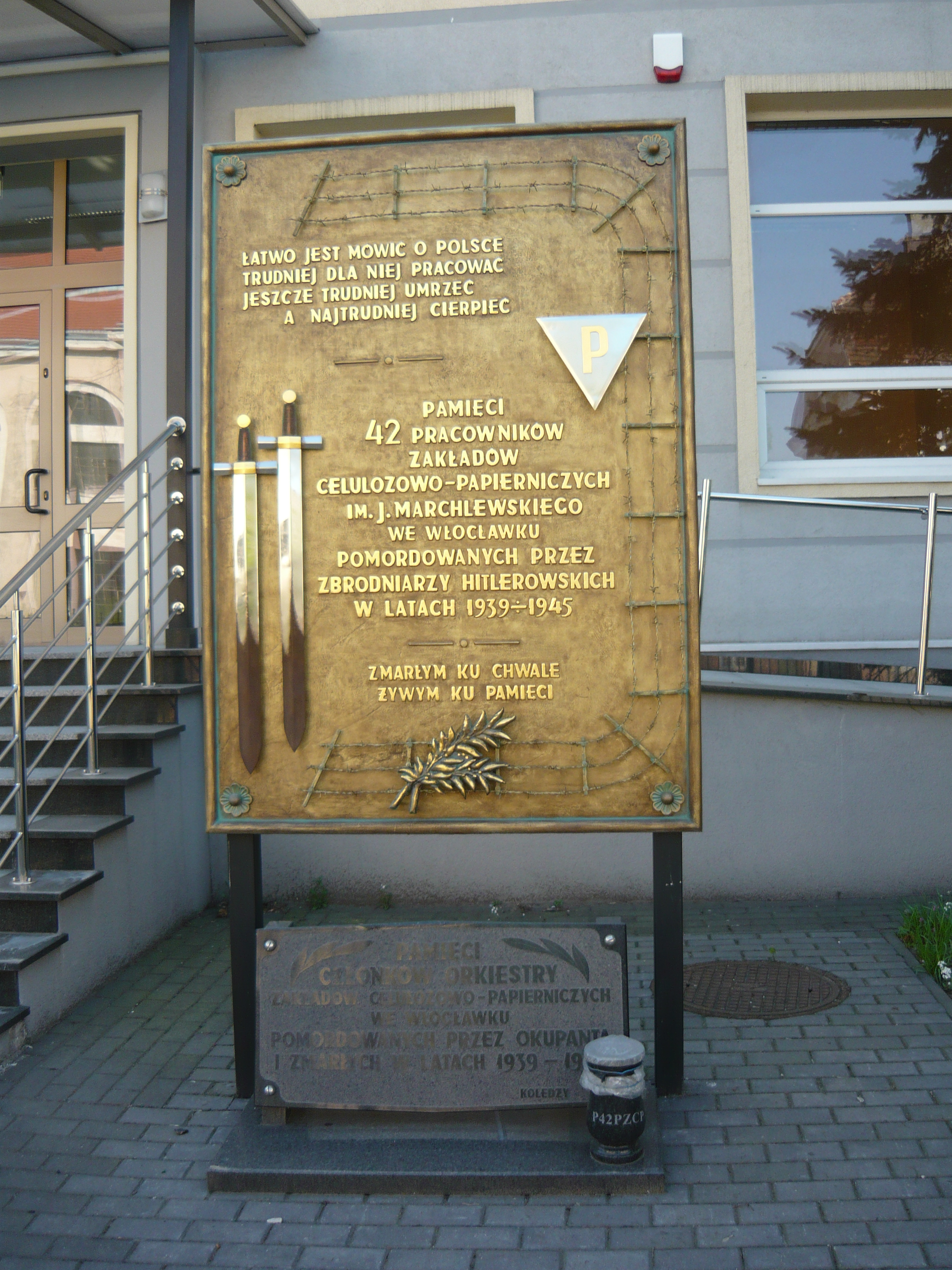
Memorial to murdered paper factory workers

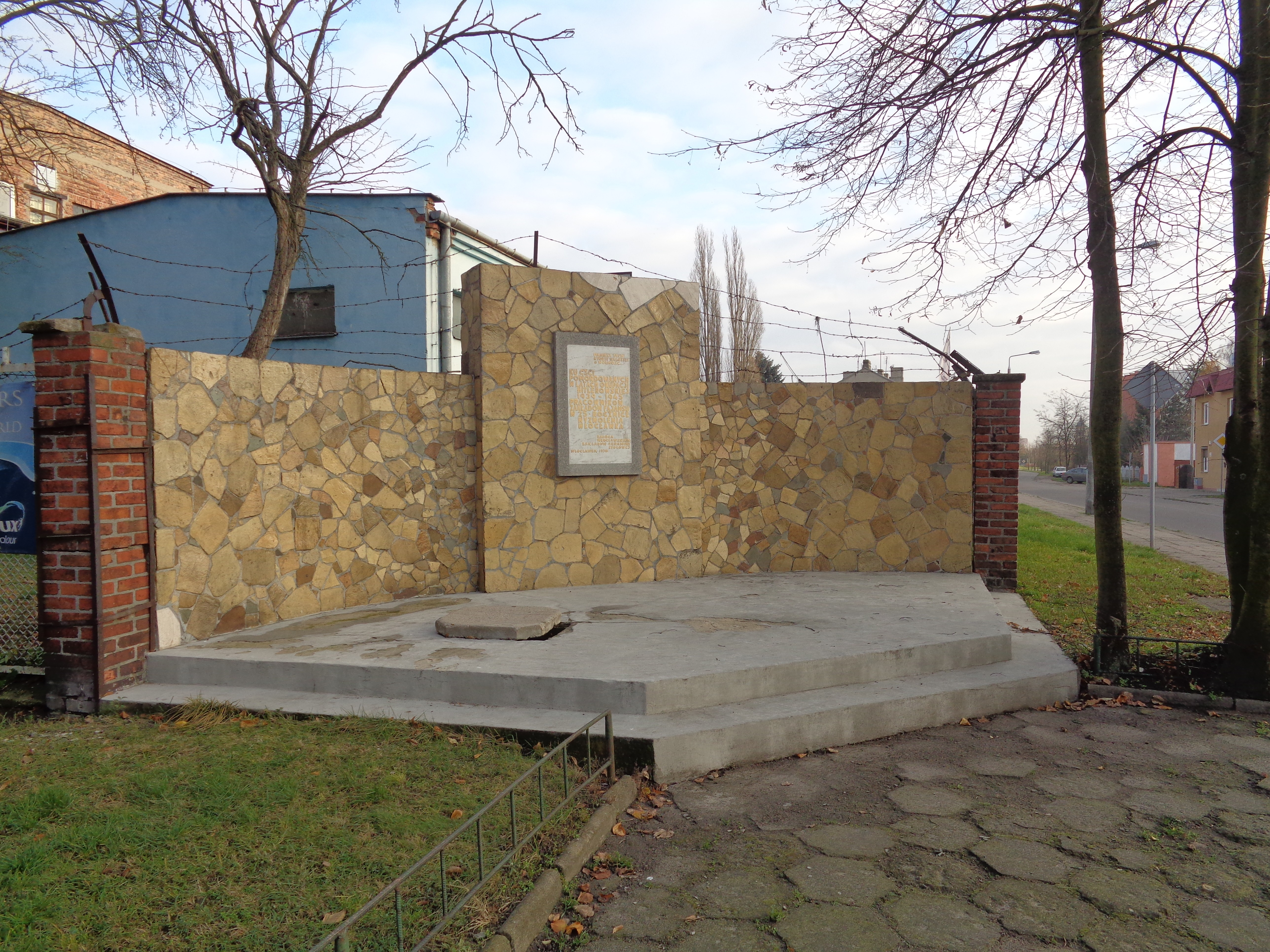
Memorial to murdered pottery factory workers

During World War II, Włocławek was occupied by German troops, which entered the city on 14 September 1939. Under the Nazi German occupation Włocławek was again renamed Leslau, annexed by decree to the German Reich on 8 October 1939 and administered from 26 October as a part of Reichsgau Posen (renamed on 29 January 1940 Reichsgau Wartheland).

Already in September 1939, Germans committed a massacre of a group of local Jews. The Einsatzgruppe III entered the city between September 23 and October 5, 1939, and afterwards carried out mass arrests of local Poles in October and November as part of the Intelligenzaktion. Dozens of Catholic priests from Włocławek, including Auxiliary Bishop of Włocławek Michał Kozal, and lecturers and students of the seminary were arrested, and then deported in January 1940 to the Dachau concentration camp, where most of them were killed. Rector of the local seminary Henryk Kaczorowski and two students Bronisław Kostkowski and Tadeusz Dulny are now considered three of the 108 Blessed Polish Martyrs of World War II by the Catholic Church. Local teachers were arrested in October 1939, and then deported to concentration camps and murdered. In late 1939, the SS and Selbstschutz burnt down the Grzywno district and murdered many of its inhabitants in the nearby village of Warząchewka Polska. Poles from Włocławek were also massacred in the nearby village of Pińczata. Arrested Polish teachers, landowners and priests from the Włocławek and Lipno counties were also imprisoned in Włocławek, and some were later also deported to concentration camps and murdered. Over 30 Poles, who were either born, educated or lived and worked in Włocławek, were murdered by the Russians in the Katyn massacre in 1940.

Families of deported and murdered Poles, as well as the remaining residents of Grzywno were expelled to the so-called General Government in late 1939, and in 1940 also owners of shops, workshops and bigger houses were expelled, so their properties could be handed over to German colonists as part of the Lebensraum policy. The Germans also robbed the precious historical collections of the Diocese of Włocławek and the Baroque Franciscan monastery and closed down the cathedral. The city's central square, Plac Wolności ("Liberty Square"), was renamed Adolf-Hitler-Platz by the Germans. By the time the war ended, nearly the entire Jewish population of more than 10,000 had been murdered.

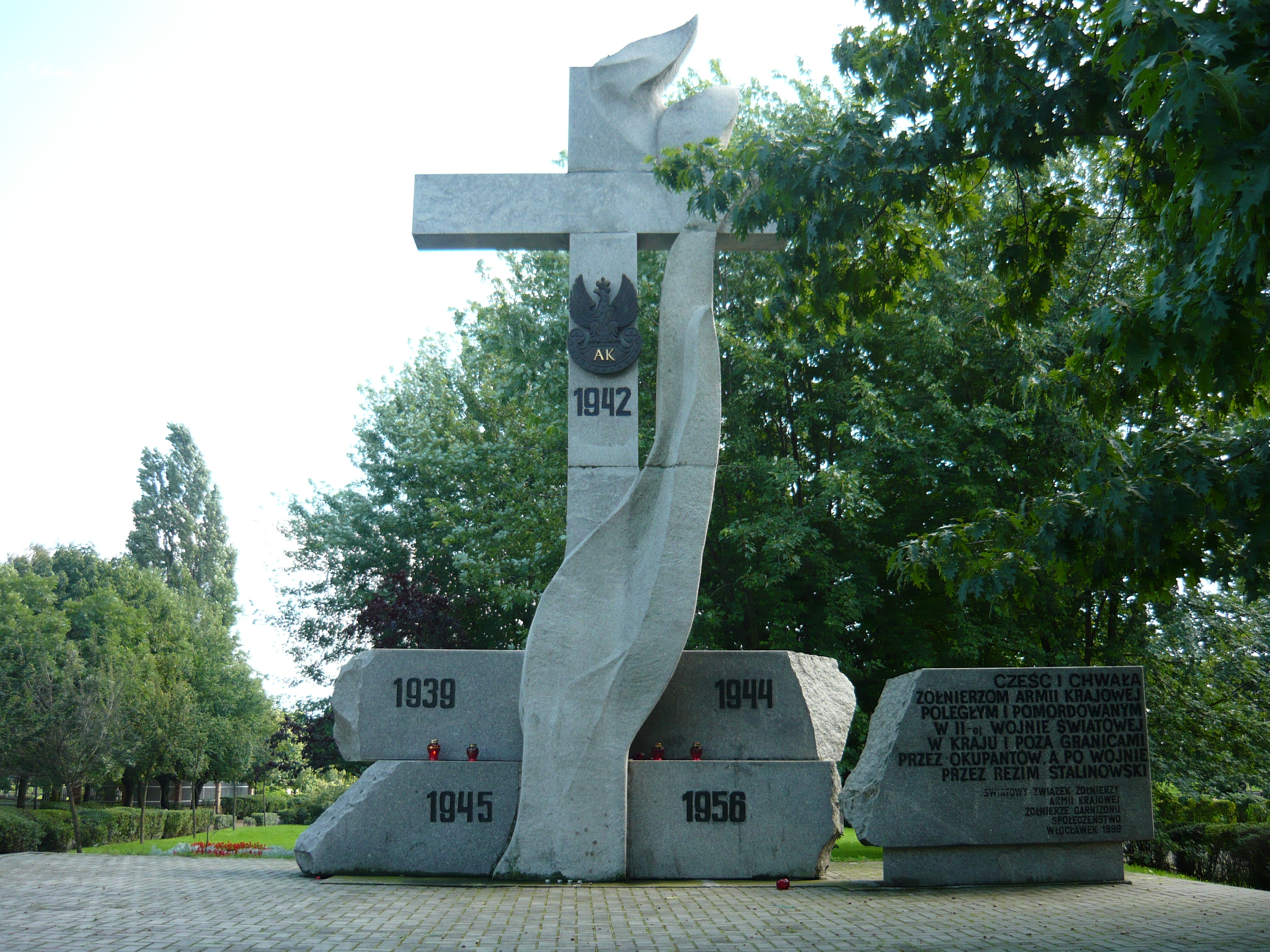
Monument of the Home Army, the leading Polish resistance movement in World War II

Włocławek was captured on 20 January 1945 by Soviet troops of the 1st Belorussian Front during the Vistula–Oder Offensive. From February to April 1945, the Russians looted local factories and enterprises of grain (over 200 tons), coal (over 50 tons), fuel, machinery, cars, spirits, office equipment, which were taken en masse to the Soviet Union. Mass Soviet requisitions in the county caused food shortages in Włocławek. One third of the city was destroyed, but its factories and workshops were rebuilt by the Polish government in the following decades.

=== Recent period ===
The most important industries in Włocławek today are chemical industry, production of furniture, and food processing. The dam which was constructed in 1969 regulates the water level of the Vistula river, forming Włocławek Reservoir. From 1975 to 1999, the city was the capital of the Włocławek Voivodeship.

The Catholic priest Fr. (now Blessed), Jerzy Popiełuszko, who was associated with the workers' and trade union movement Solidarity, and who was also a member of the opposition to the Communist regime in Poland, was tortured and murdered by three Security Police officers, and was thrown into the Włocławek Reservoir, close to the city. His body was recovered from the reservoir on 30 October 1984.

From 2012 the city is part of the Special Economic Zone - Włocławek Economic Development Area – Industrial and Technological Park with tax-free areas and incentives for investors.

=== The Jewish Community in Włocławek ===
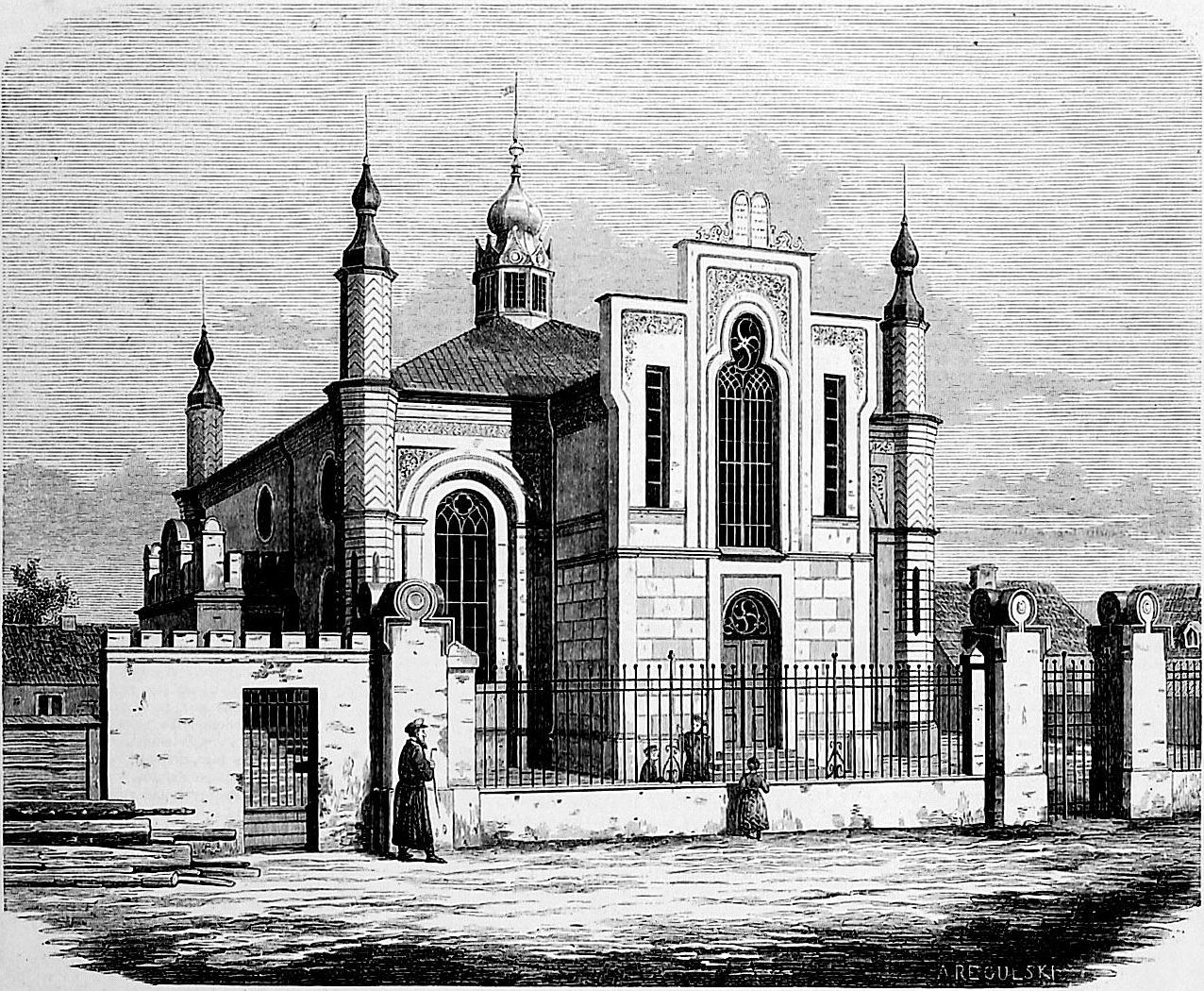
Old Great Synagogue before its destruction

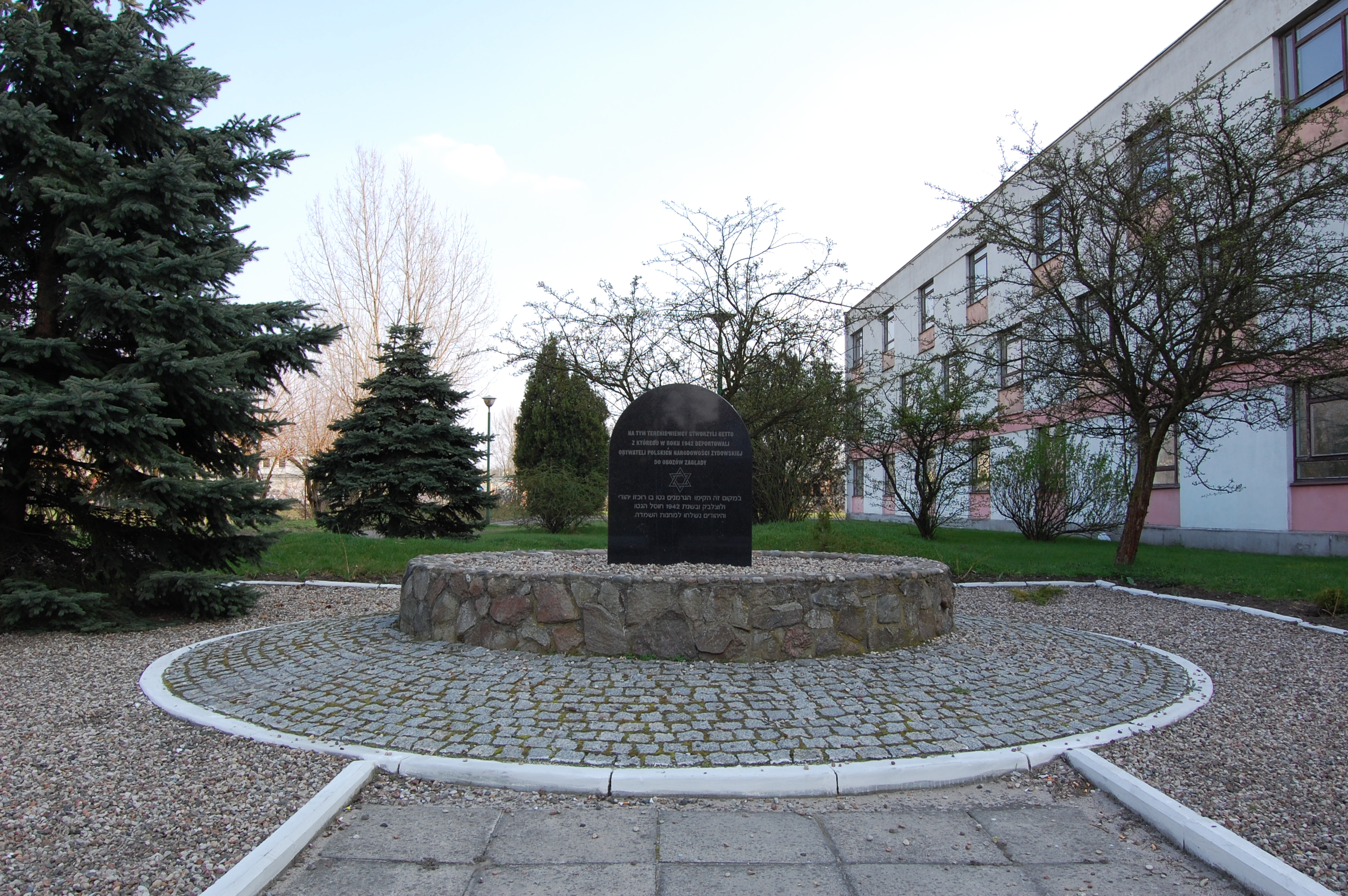
Memorial at the site of the former World War II ghetto

The Jewish population increased from 218 (6.6%) in 1820 to 6,919 in 1910 (20.5%) and 13,500 in 1939. One of the founders of the Mizracḥi movement, rabbi Leib Kowalski (1895–1925), lived and worked in Włocławek. During the interbellum period, the town had several Jewish schools (primary and high schools), two yeshivas, and three Jewish sports clubs.

With the beginning of the German occupation of Poland, Włocławek became the first town in Europe in which Jews were required to wear distinctive yellow badges. Murders of Jews began in 1939 and the Włocławek ghetto was created in November 1940. The Nazis deported 3,000 of Włocławek's Jews to ghettos and labor camps between December 1939 and June 1941. Some 2,000 Jews were deported to Łódź and then to the Chełmno extermination camp between 26 and 30 September 1941. The ghetto was burnt in late April 1942 after the remaining Jews were sent to Chelmno where they were immediately gassed. Most of the Jews sent to the Łódź Ghetto died of starvation or illness, and many were sent to Auschwitz from Łódź.

After the war nearly 1000 Jews returned to Włocławek and re-established their community. However, Jews left after disputes within the community itself, and the desire of most Jews not to live under Communism, installed by the Soviets. By the late 1960s, the community had disappeared.

Today there are low traces of their community. There is a table for victims of Jewish ghetto in Włocławek's Rakutówek neighborhood (Polish Tablica Ofiar Getta we Włocławku) and Jewish Cemetery at Municipal/Communal Cemetery (Polish Cmentarz Komunalny we Włocławku).

== Demographics ==
Historical population

Year	Pop.	±%
1950	54,536	—
1960	66,820	+22.5%
1970	82,599	+23.6%
1980	106,771	+29.3%

Year	Pop.	±%
1990	122,144	+14.4%
2000	121,833	−0.3%
2010	116,914	−4.0%
2020	108,561	−7.1%

== Historical monuments ==
Historic churches of Włocławek (examples)

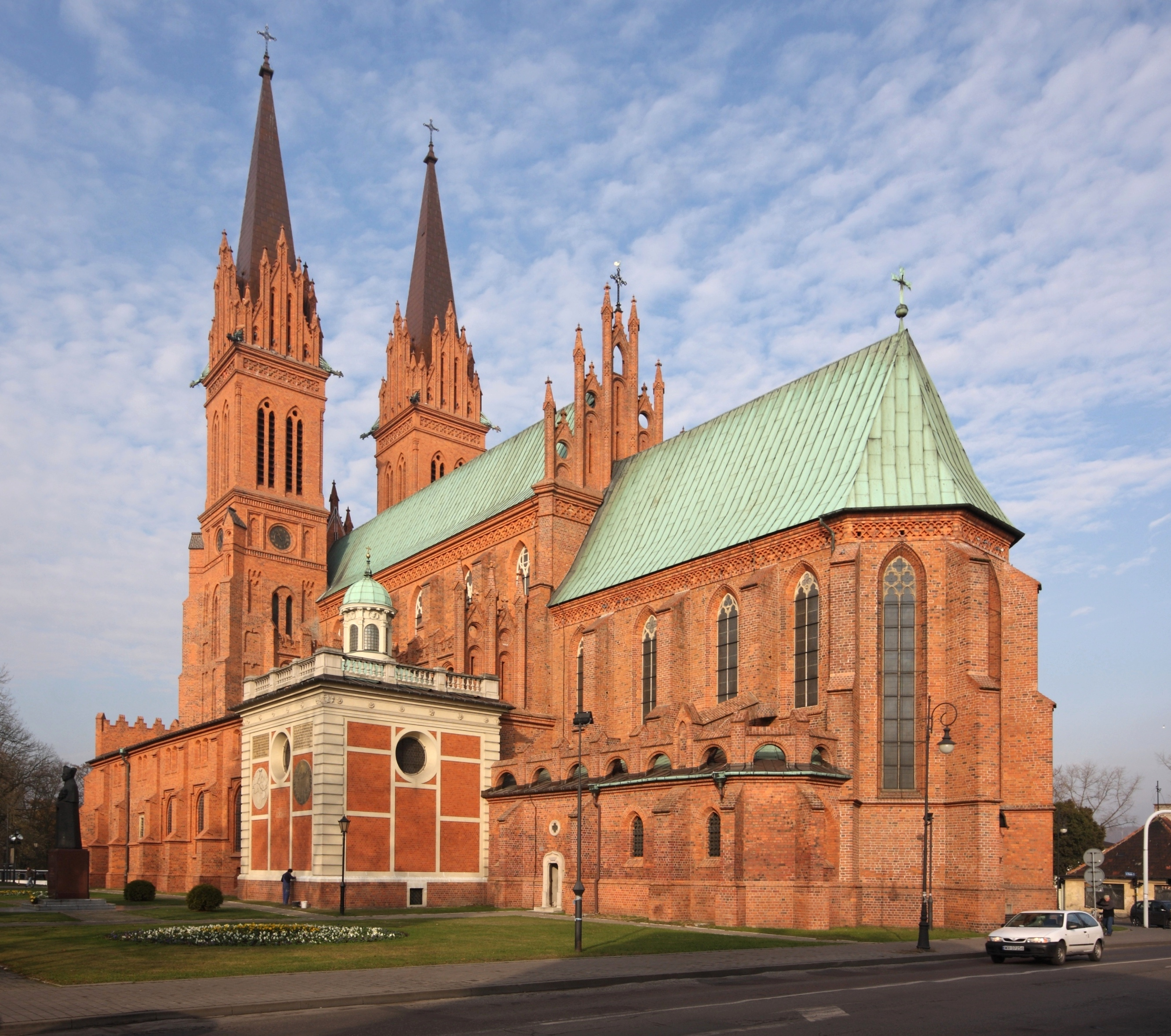
Włocławek Cathedral

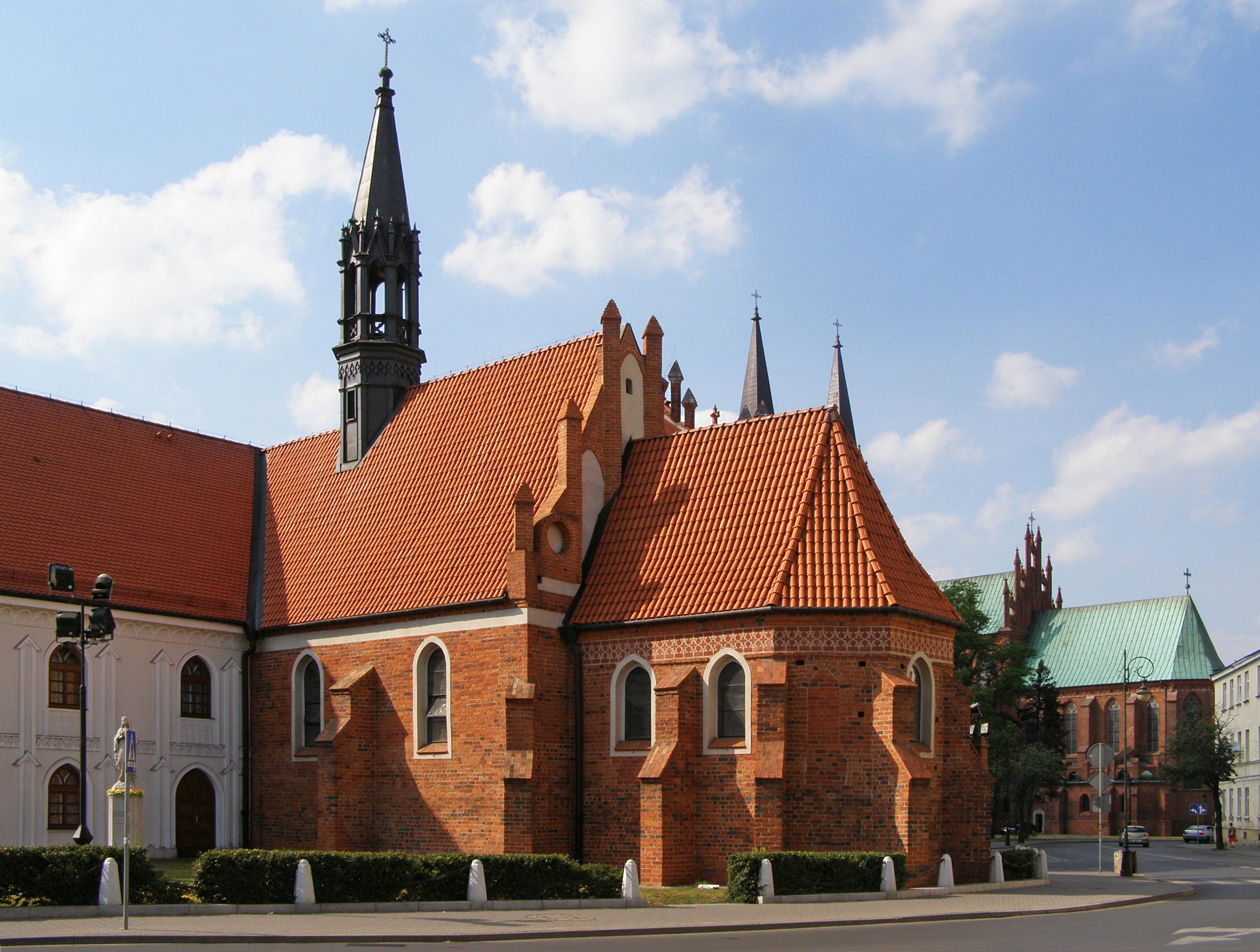
Saint Vitalis church

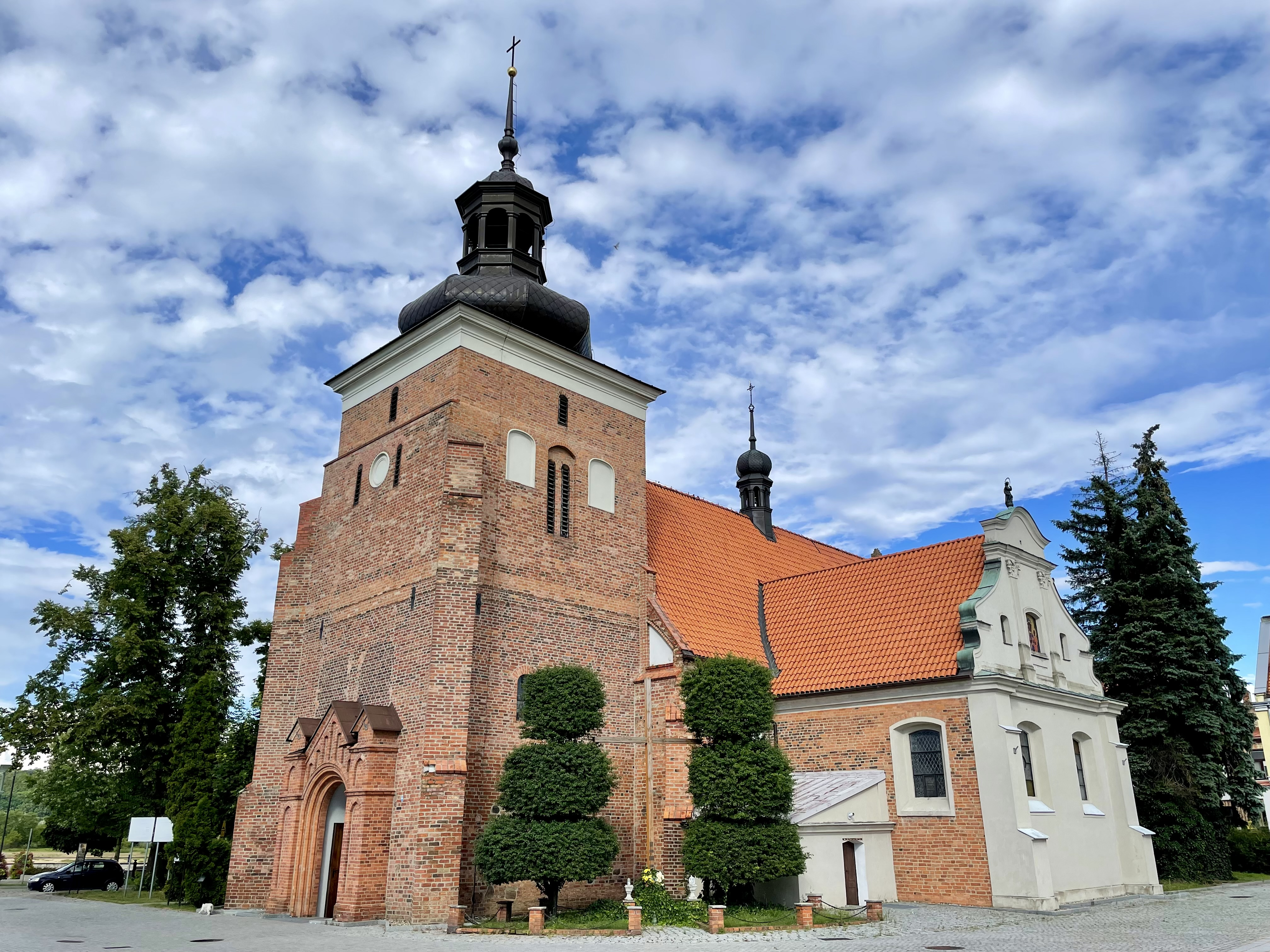
Saint John the Baptist church

Saint Stanislaus church

- Copernicus Square (Polish: Plac Kopernika) is located near the cathedral school of the Basilica Cathedral of St. Mary Assumption in Włocławek where Nicolaus Copernicus studied between 1488 and 1491. Together with his teacher, Mikołaj Wódka (Abstemius), he built a sundial for the Cathedral Basilica. In the square there is the monument of Nicolaus Copernicus, the main office of the Higher Seminary, founded in 1569 (second seminary in Poland, and also one of the oldest in the world).
- St. Vitalis Church, 1330, is the oldest Gothic building in Włocławek. Inside the church there are works of Polish 15th-century painting, including a triptych with the scene of the Crowning of St. Mary (1460). In front of the Basilica Cathedral there is a monument of prominent Polish primate Stefan Wyszyński who lived in Włocławek between 1917 and 1946.
- Gothic Basilica Cathedral of St. Mary of the Assumption (Polish: Bazylika katedralna Wniebowzięcia Najświętszej Maryi Panny) was built in 1340-1411 and was later rebuilt. It is one of the oldest and tallest (86 m) churches in Poland, and it is listed as a Historic Monument of Poland. The Cathedral contains furnishing in various styles, including Renaissance and Baroque, and paintings by Francisco de Zurbarán, Juan Correa de Vivar, sculptures by Veit Stoss and stained glass windows by Józef Mehoffer.

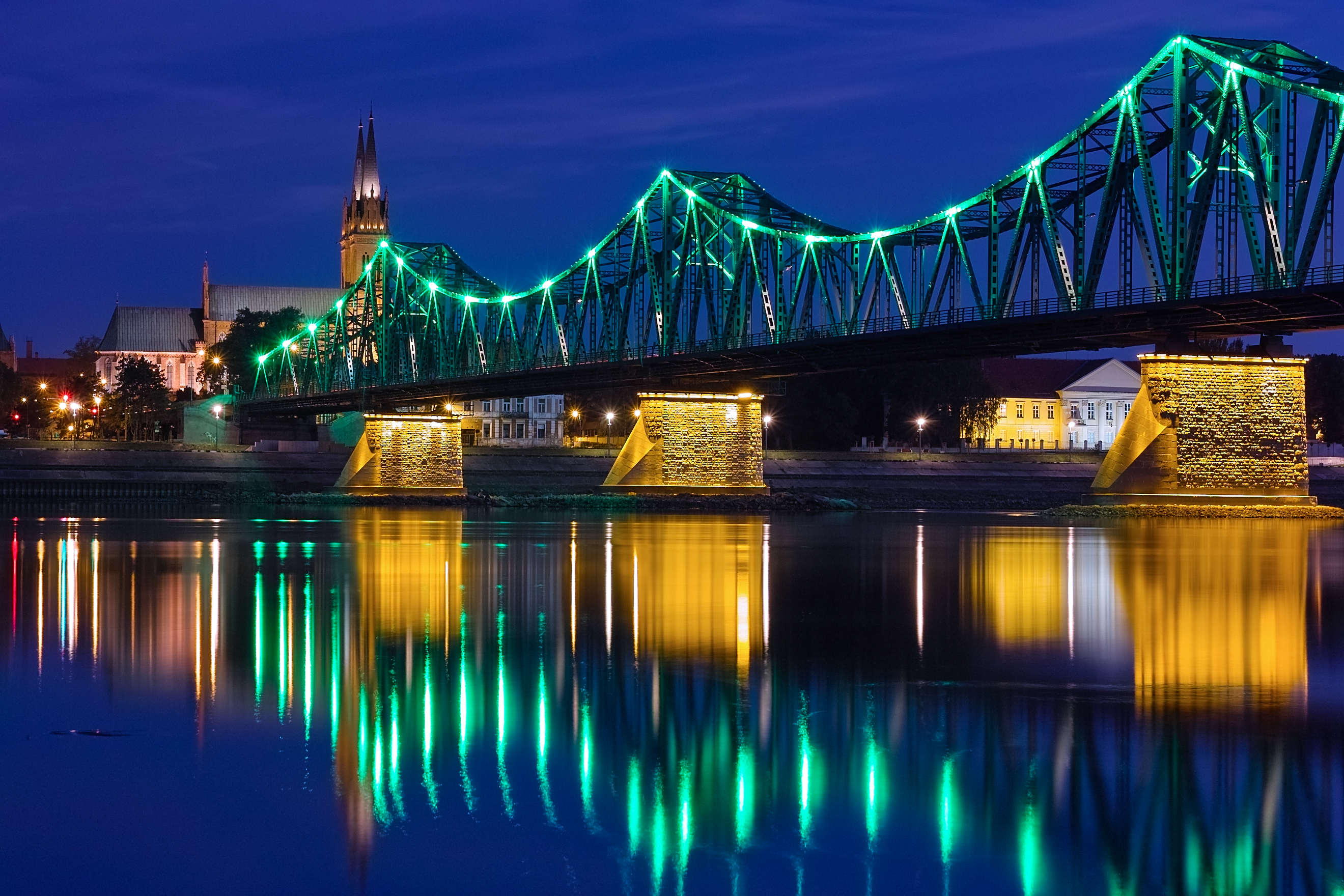
Old Town in Włocławek

- The Henryk Sienkiewicz Municipal Park (Polish: Park Miejski im. Henryka Sienkiewicza) is one of the oldest parks in Poland. In the park there is a bust of Henryk Sienkiewicz, a prominent writer and the winner of the Nobel Prize for Quo Vadis.
- Bishop's Palace (Pałac Biskupi) is located on the Gdanska street by the river. It served as the bishop's residence from 1858 to 1861 and includes a garden.
- Marshall Józef Piłsudski Boulevards (Bulwary im. Marszałka Józefa Piłsudskiego) and Bridge of Marschall Edward Rydz-Smigły
- Historic houses in the Old Market Square

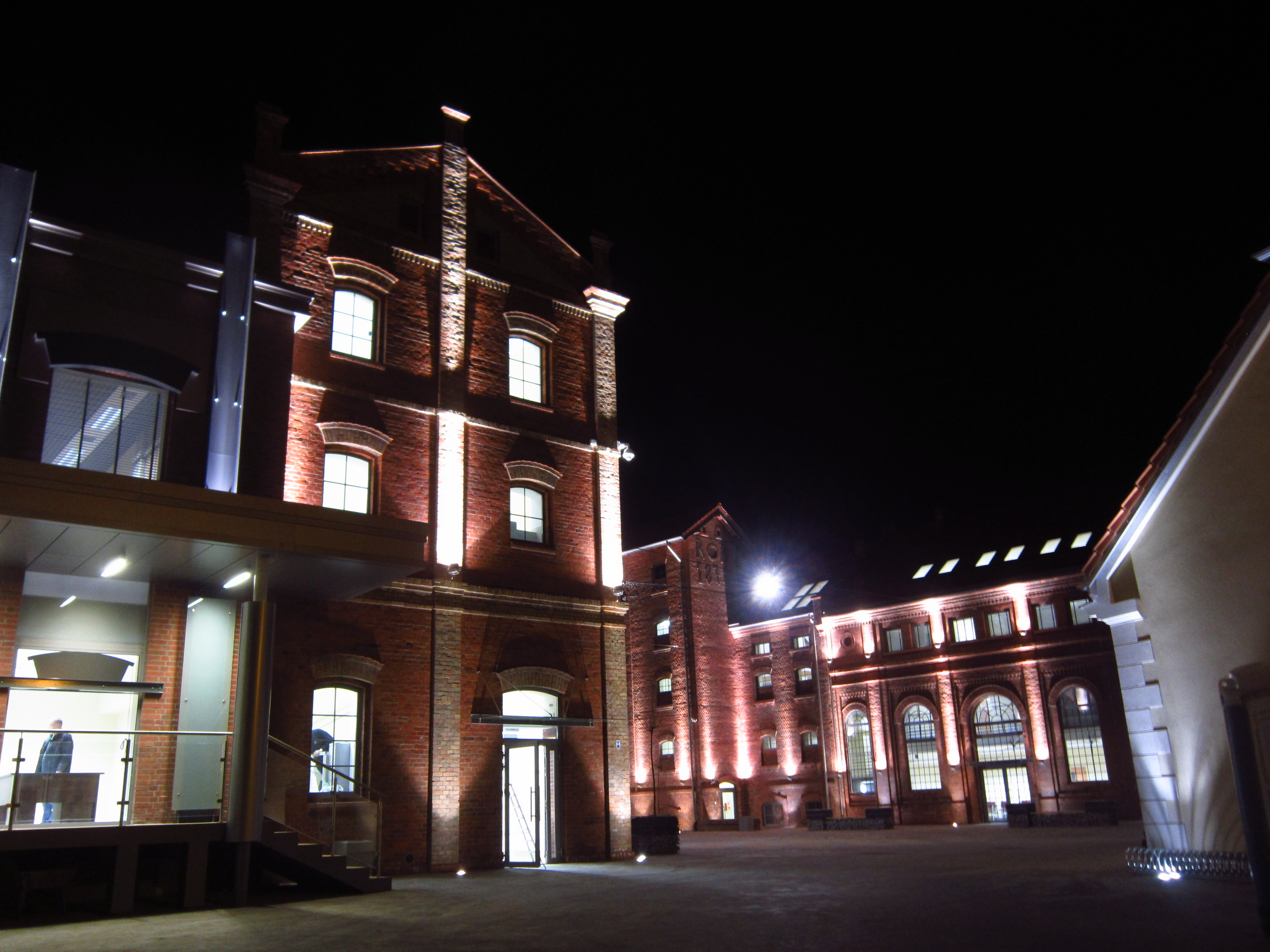
B Brewery Cultural Center

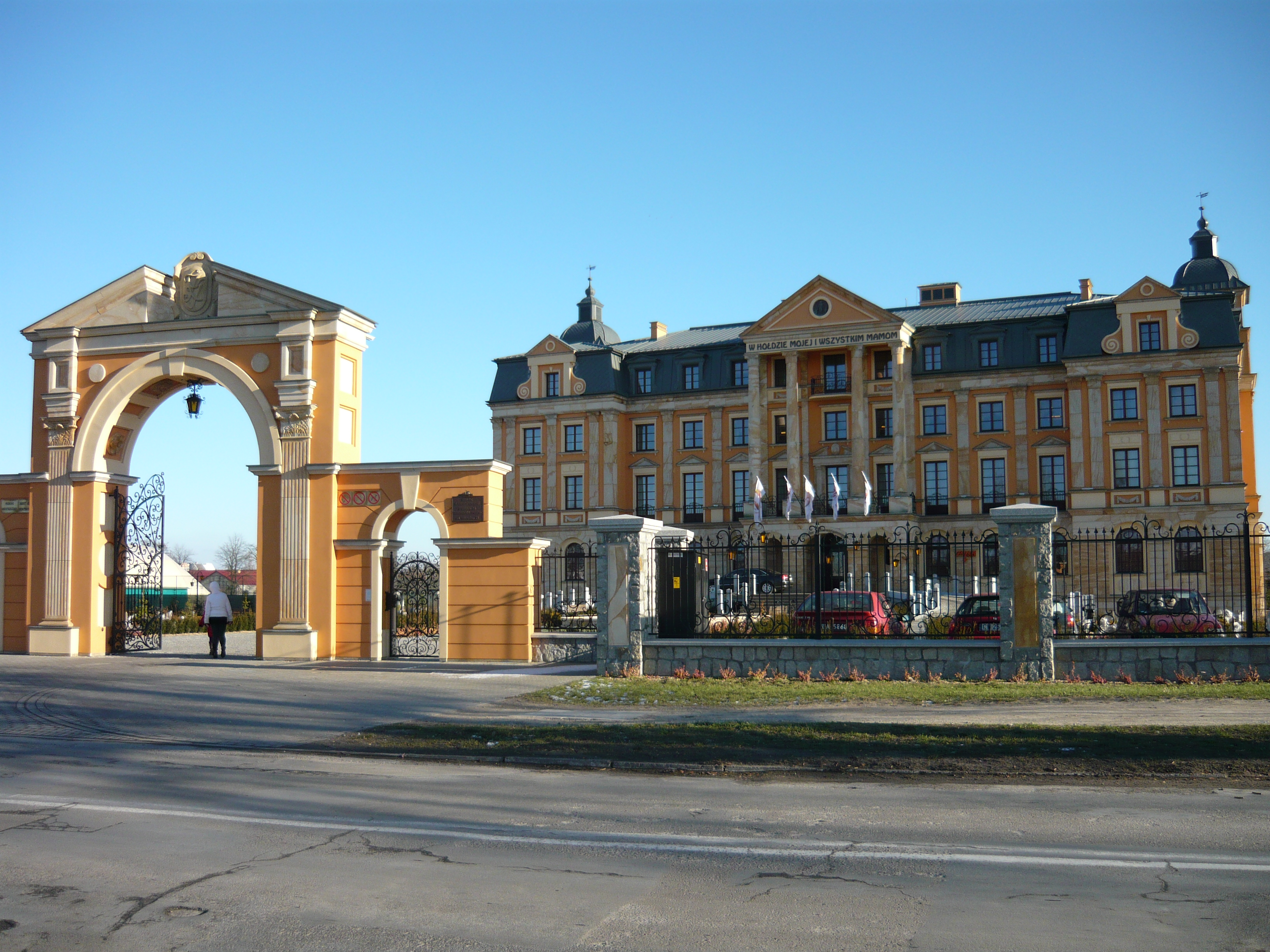
Amber Palace (Pałac Bursztynowy)

- Brewery B Culture Center. The former brewery built in 1832 houses a modern culture center with a concert hall, culture associations, small cinema, museum of measurements and café.
- Black Granary (Czarny Spichrz) was built between the 18th and 19th centuries. It is the only construction of that kind that still exists in Poland. It currently houses the Dobrzynsko-Kujawskie Cultural Society and the Art Club Piwnica.
- Church of St. John the Baptist (Kościół pw. Św. Jana Chrzciciela), a Gothic-Baroque church from 1538 with Baroque furnishings.
- All Saints church and Franciscan-Reformers cloister (Kościół i Klasztor Ojców Franciszkanów) was built in 1639–1644, in Baroque style with Gothic elements. Here is a Baroque aisle and Rococo altars from the 18th century.
- Evangelical church was built 1877–79, but in the 17th century was here a wooden church, with an interesting altar with painting in convention of Paul Delaroche.
- Liberty (Freedom) Square (Polish: Plac Wolności) It is the town's central square, with the monument dedicated to the Polish soldiers of the II World War, a hotel Zajazd Polski (18th century), restaurant, banks and shops. Here is the All Saints church and Franciscan-Reformers cloister, Mühsam Palace from the 19th century.
- The Włocławek Dam (Zapora Wodna na Wiśle, Tama we Włocławku) was built in 1970 and is the largest reservoir in Poland. On the right river's bank a monumental crucifix has been erected to commemorate priest Jerzy Popiełuszko murdered by the communist police.
- Wzorcownia, shopping and entertainment center in the former faience factory of Teichefeld & Atserblum from 1873.
- Green Market (Zielony Rynek) is the historical place of trade. There are tenement houses from the 19th and 20th century, as well as a baker's shop, confectionery store, and clothes stores. Here is also the Main City Office with Mayor's Bureau and Gallery of Modern Art.
- Municipal/Communal Cemetery (Cmentarz Komunalny we Włocławku) - central cemetery in the city between streets: Komunalna, Chopina, Aleja Królowej Jadwigi. There are here parts: Polish, Jewish, German (Protestants), Russian (Orthodox), victims of both world wars. There is also an Orthodox Church.
- Numerous World War II memorials

== Museums ==
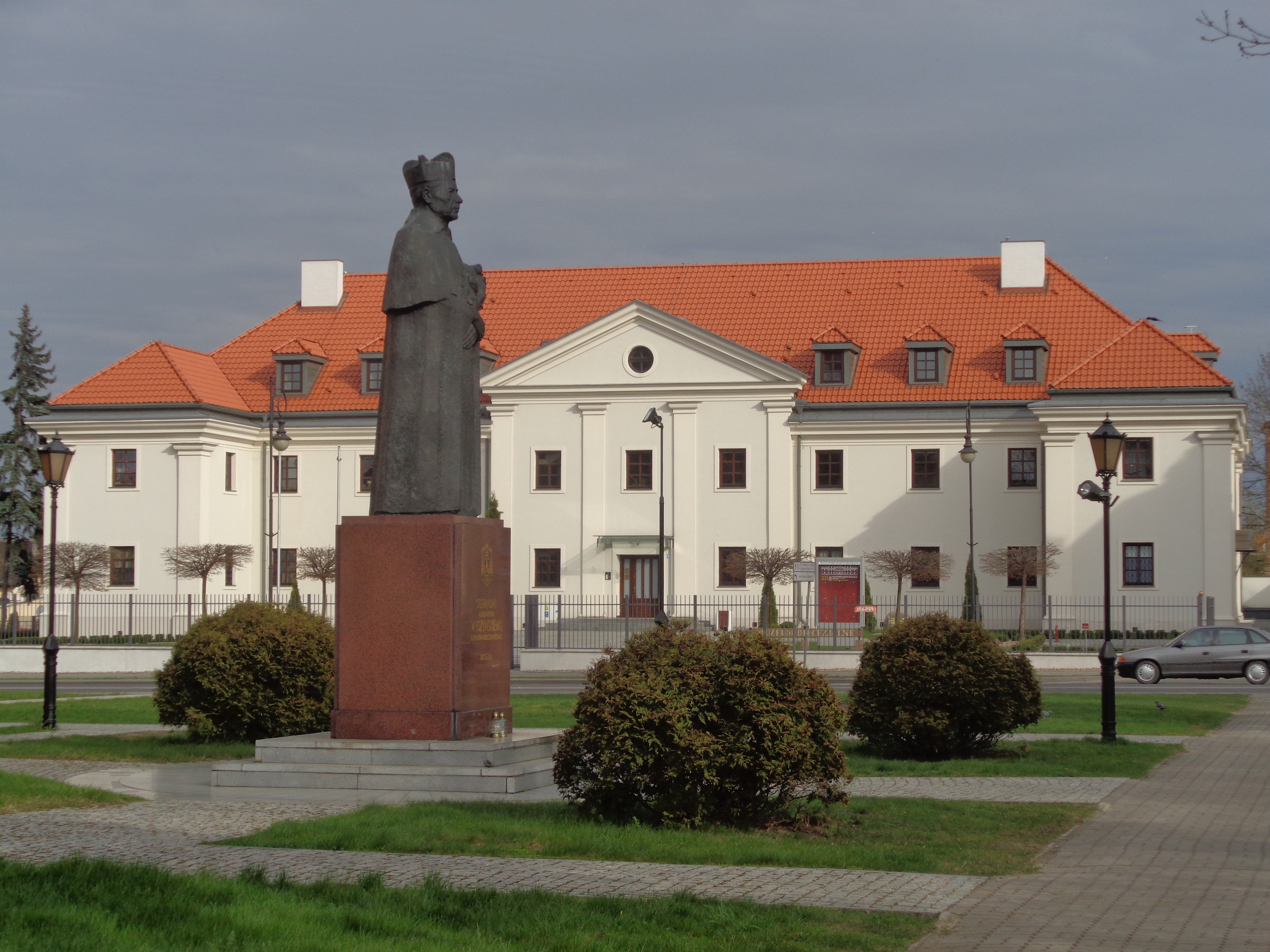
Diocesan Museum

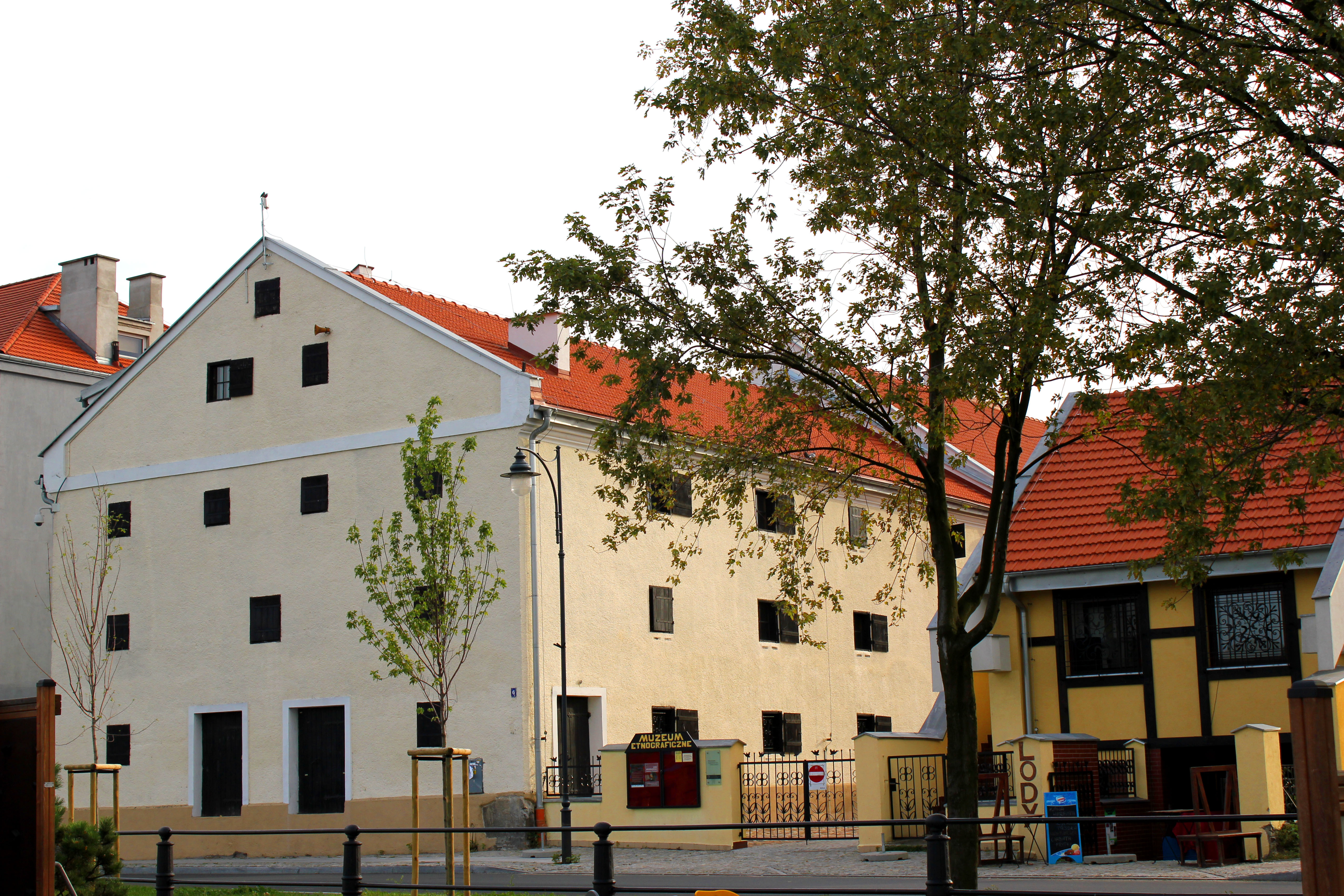
Ethnographic Museum

- Diocesan Museum

Next to Basilica Cathedral there is the Diocesan Museum (Polish Muzeum Diecezjalne) with paintings by Guercino, and prints by Albrecht Dürer. The Seminary Library of Chodynski Brothers keeps precious manuscripts, including missals from 1500.

- Museum of the Kujawy and Dobrzyn Land
- Main Edifice

It hosts two permanent exhibitions: "Włocławek`s Faience" and "The Gallery of Polish portraits" with works by Józef Simmler, Teodor Axentowicz (neoclassicism); Leon Wyczółkowski (impressionism); Jacek Malczewski and Vlastimil Hofman (symbolism), Józef Mehoffer, Stanisław Ignacy Witkiewicz, Wojciech Kossak, Alfons Karpiński, Olga Boznańska (1920s and 1930s), Anthony van Dyck or Marcello Bacciarelli.

- The Ethnography Museum

The museum is located in a historic granary and hosts an exhibition by Franciszek Tournelle. It showcases the most important elements of folk culture and equipment of house interior and farm of Kuyavia: farming, breeding, fishing, pottery, blacksmithing, cart-wrighting, cooperage, plaiting, historic folk sculpture, shrovetide customs, and musical instruments.

- The Museum of the History of Włocławek

The museum consists of two historic Baroque houses from the 16th and 18th century on the Old Market. They exhibit artefacts connected with the history of Włocławek and Poland from archaeological excavations to Liberation of Włocławek in 1945 including the Bowl of Włocławek (10th century) and elements of knights armour (14th and 15th century), objects related to the economic life of Włocławek (16th and 17th century), measures and weights, treasures with coins from the 12th to 18th centuries, pharmaceutics from the 19th and 20th centuries, memorabilia of big industry in the 19th century, memorabilia of the Fire Department, sports trophies, uniforms, firearms, weapons, photographs and the archives of national uprisings, Polish-Soviet War (1919–1921), interwar decades, and World War I and World War II, models of non-existent buildings (city hall, St. Wojciech Church and St. Mikołaj Orthodox Church) and the reconstruction of a photo atelier.

- The Art Collection

A sizeable art collection is also located in a granary built in 1839. There are two permanent exhibitions there: religious (human and animal sculptures by Stanisław Zagajewski known as "Polish Gaudi" from group of l`art brut) and an exhibition of works by Wacław Bębnowski (ceramic sculptures and functional objects with Art Nouveau motifs, naked nymphs and elements of the Far East).
Exhibitions of Italian, German or Netherlandish art from 17th/18th centuries include: Paintings by Carlo Cignani, Georg Philipp Rugendas, Francesco de' Rossi, graphs of Rembrandt van Rijn, Albrecht Altdorfer, Heinrich Aldegrever, Parmigianino, Vespasiano Strada oder Lucas van Leyden.

== Włocławek districts ==
Włocławek districts

- Michelin
- Południe (South)
- Rybnica
- Śródmieście (City centre)
- Wschód Leśny (East forest area)
- Wschód Mieszkaniowy (East residential area), a.k.a. Dzielnica Wschód (East District)
- Wschód Przemysłowy (East industrial area), a.k.a. Dzielnica Wschód (East District)
- Zachód Przemysłowy (West industrial area)
- Zawiśle
- Zazamcze.

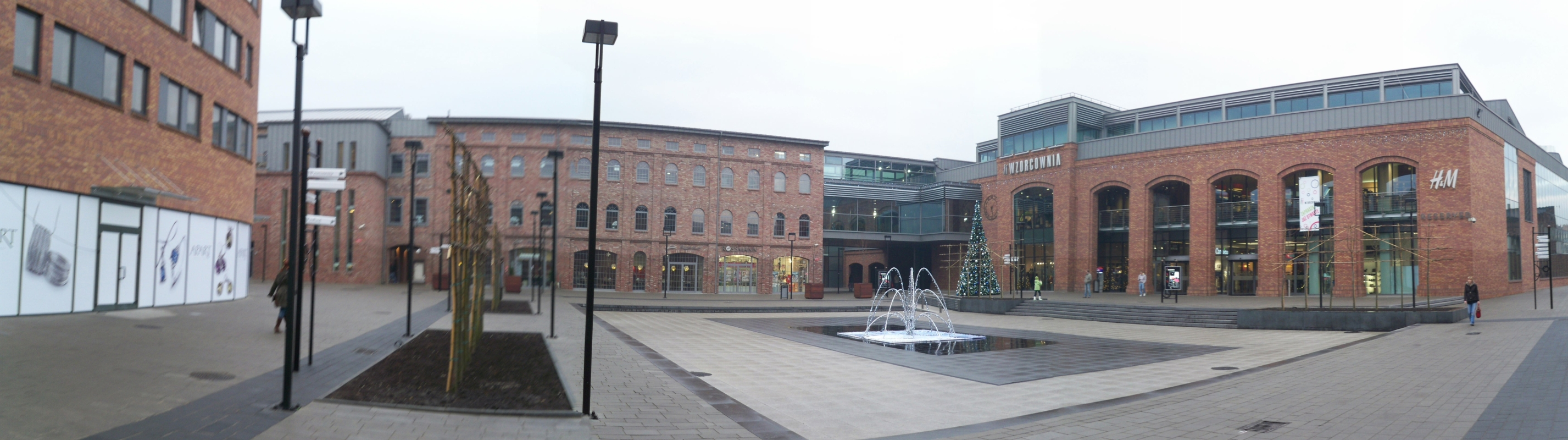
Wzorcownia, Gord Square (Plac Grodzki) in downtown (Śródmieście)

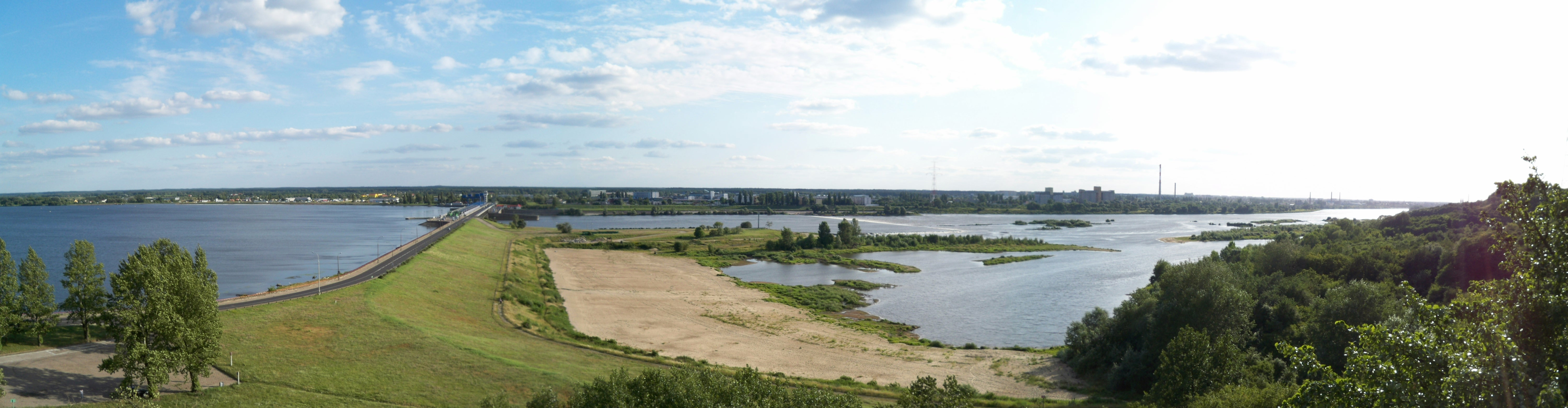
Włocławek Dam – Hydroelectric Power Station in Włocławek (Elektrownia Wodna we Włocławku)

== Culture and free time ==
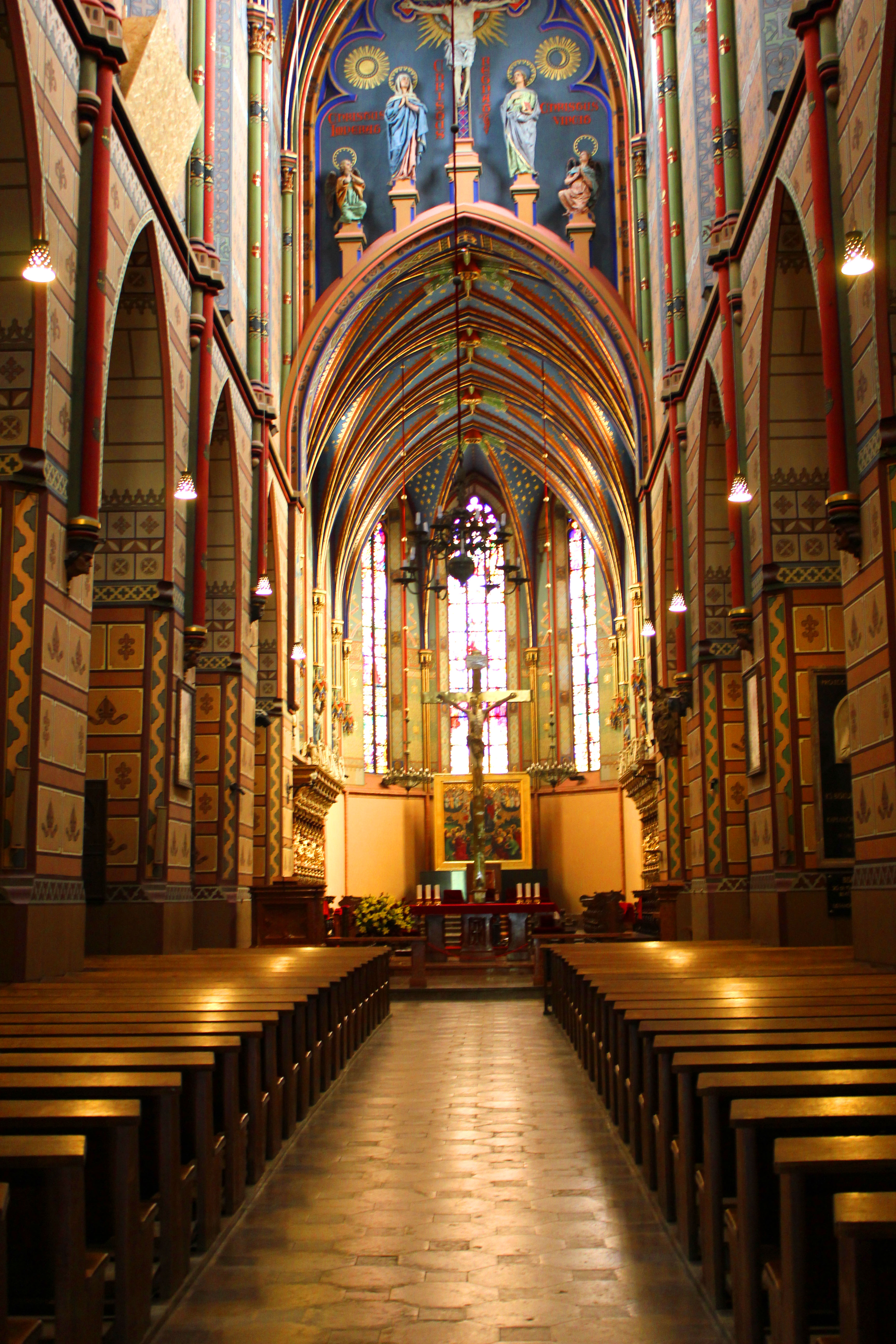
Interior of the Włocławek Cathedral

- Culture center Browar B
- OSIR - Sports center with new football stadium, swimming pool, aqua park, tennis courts or sea resorts
- Yacht areas: Przystań nad Wisłą OSIR we Włocławku, Przystań OSIR nad Zalewem Włocławskim (with place for campers), Marina Yacht Club Anwil in Zarzeczewo (with place for camping)
- Wakepark Włocławek
- Theater: Teatr Impresaryjny im. W. Gniazdowskiego, Teatr "Nasz", Teatr Skene
- Gallery of Modern Art, Galeria at Kuyavia-Dobrzyń Culture Society, Galeria SK, Galeria Migawka, Galeria Antresola,
- Gostynin-Włocławek Landscape Park with over 40 lakes
- Rope parks: Park Linowy Włocławek Jezioro Czarne (at Lake Czarne) or Park Linowy Włocławek Aleja Kazimierza Wielkiego (at Kazimierz Wielki Avenue)
- Airport Kruszyn and Aeroklub Włocławek
- Horse clubs: Arabians Falborek, Pensjonat Michelin, Klub Jeździecki Bogucin
- Quad-Park in Włocławek.
- A developed network of bike lanes.

== Sports clubs ==
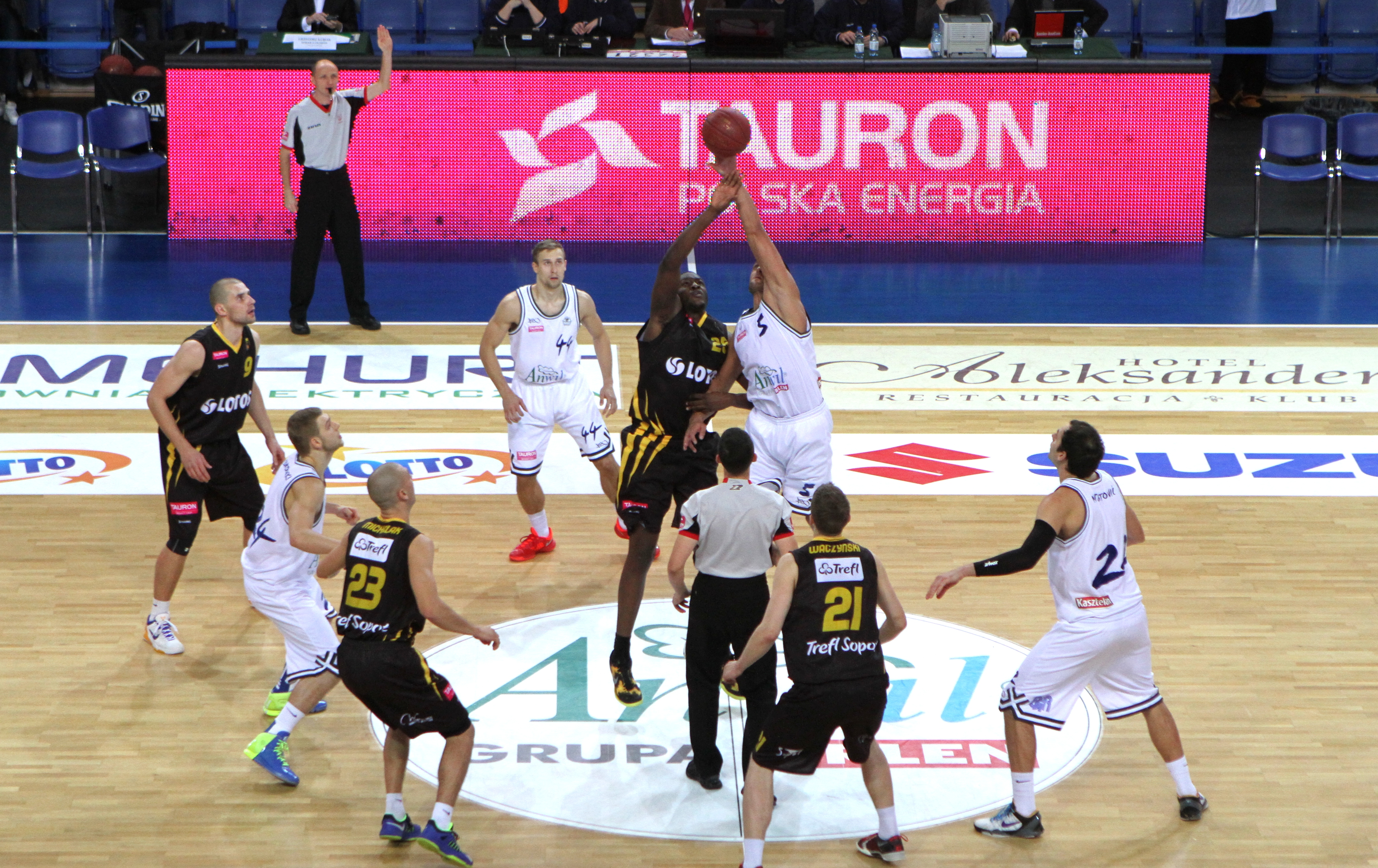
Polish Basketball League match between Anwil Włocławek and Trefl Sopot in Włocławek in 2013

- Anwil Włocławek – men's basketball team, which competes in the country's top flight, three-time Polish Champion (2003, 2018, 2019) and 2022–23 FIBA Europe Cup winners.
- Włocłavia Włocławek – men's football team, which competes in the lower leagues, and played on the Polish second tier in season 1997–1998
- Kujawiak Włocławek – defunct men's football team, which competed on the second tier in season 2004–2005
- Włocławek Rowing Society (Włocławskie Towarzystwo Wioślarskie) - rowing team, former Polish and world Champions; founded in 1886.

== Business ==
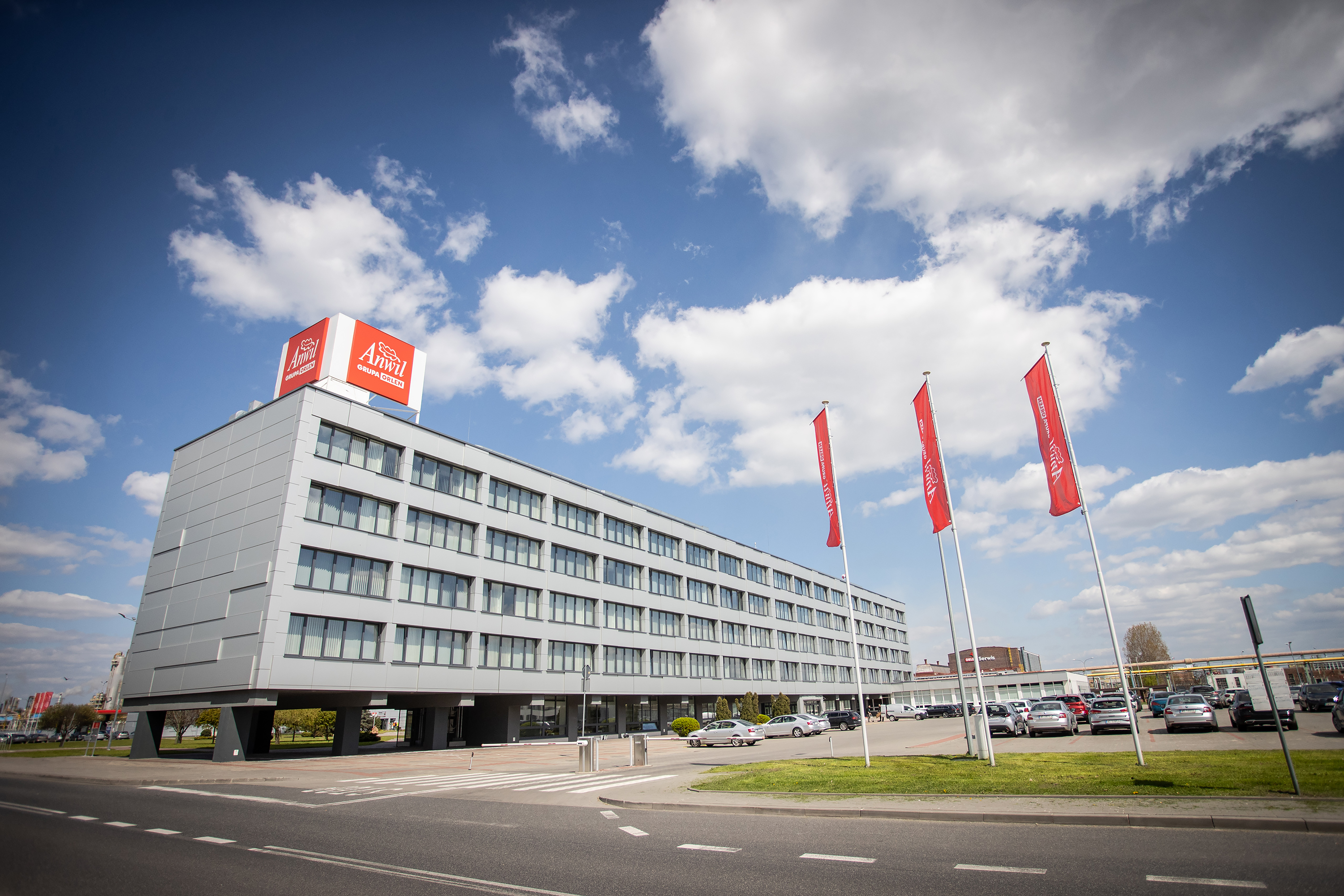
Headquarters of Anwil

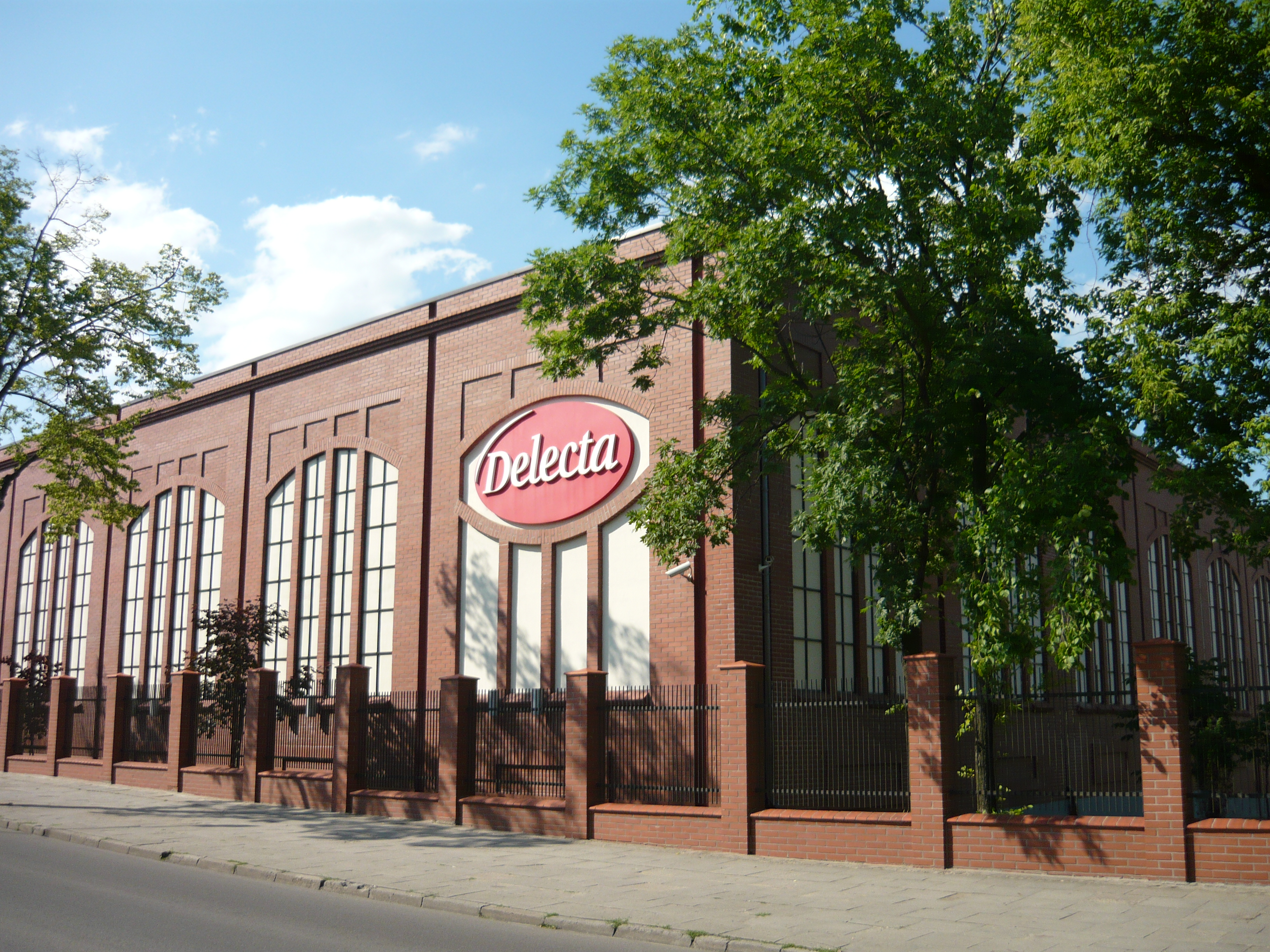
Delecta food factory

According to Rzeczpospolita report: the major corporations are:

- Anwil SA - Orlen Group, Poland
- Brügmann sp. z o.o. - Salamander Industrie Produkte Group, Germany
- Guala Closures DGS Poland SA - Italy
- Indorama Ventures - Poland, India/Thailand
- PSH Lewiatan - Poland
- Wika Polska - Germany

There are many other international companies: Delecta (Rieber&Son)- Orkla Group, Norway; Top2000 - Hamelin Group, France; Drumet - WireCo Group, USA; Kujawianka/ ATlanta Poland (Bakal Group), Poland; ACPCO2 - Belgium; Koło, Sanitec Group - France; Teutonia, Newell Rubbermaid Group - USA; Solvay - Belgium; ACV- Belgium; Remwil, Orlen Group, Poland; Budizol, Poland; Naturana - Germany; PV Prefabet, PV Group - Germany. Many transport and logistic companies have branches in or near the city.

From 2012 the city is part of the Pomeranian Special Economic Zone - Włocławek Economic Development Area – Industrial and Technological Park with tax-free areas and incentives for investors. The city is located at the A1 highway and close to the A2 highway, directly to three Polish National roads, riverway (Vistula) to Gdańsk, Berlin or Warsaw and fast rail line with many directions. Włocławek has also own energy plants (Power Plant of Anwil/ Orlen, Municipal Power Plant of City Włocławek, Water Power Plant on Vistula River).

Włocławek-based Anwil is Poland's sole producer of suspension polyvinyl chloride, which is used in the automotive, electronics, aerospace and other industries.

Another investment in Włocławek is Teren Inwestycyjny Papieżka (Investment area Papiezka) with full infrastructure and railway siding.

There are also big investment areas near Włocławek, for example in Brześć Kujawski (Brzeska Strefa Gospodarcza/ BSG). It is directly at A1 motorway ("Amber One"), railway number 18 and has 470 ha open areas for different investments. There are here internal roads, lighting, power and water infrastructure. Here are public and private lots, the most of them free of real estate tax and CIT tax. Here invested already Raben Group and Mercator Medical S.A.,

Another investment zone with full infrastructure is Czerniewice Logistic Park of company Arplast in Czerniewice, it is also at A1 motorway and railway line. The biggest advantage is its own railway siding, that is very rare in Poland.

== Education ==
=== Universities and colleges ===
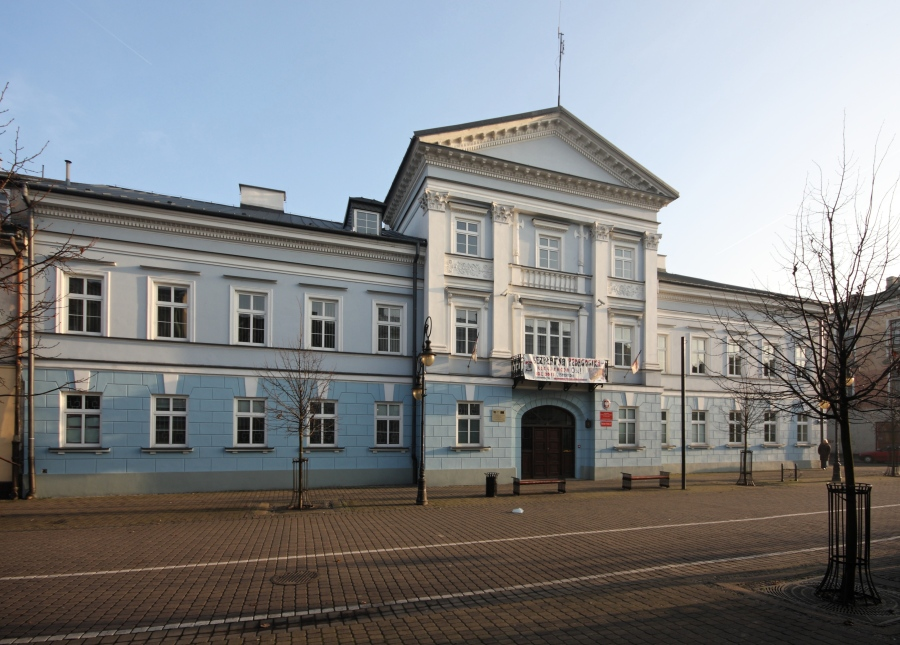
PWSZ we Włocławku (Higher Vocational State School in Włocławek)

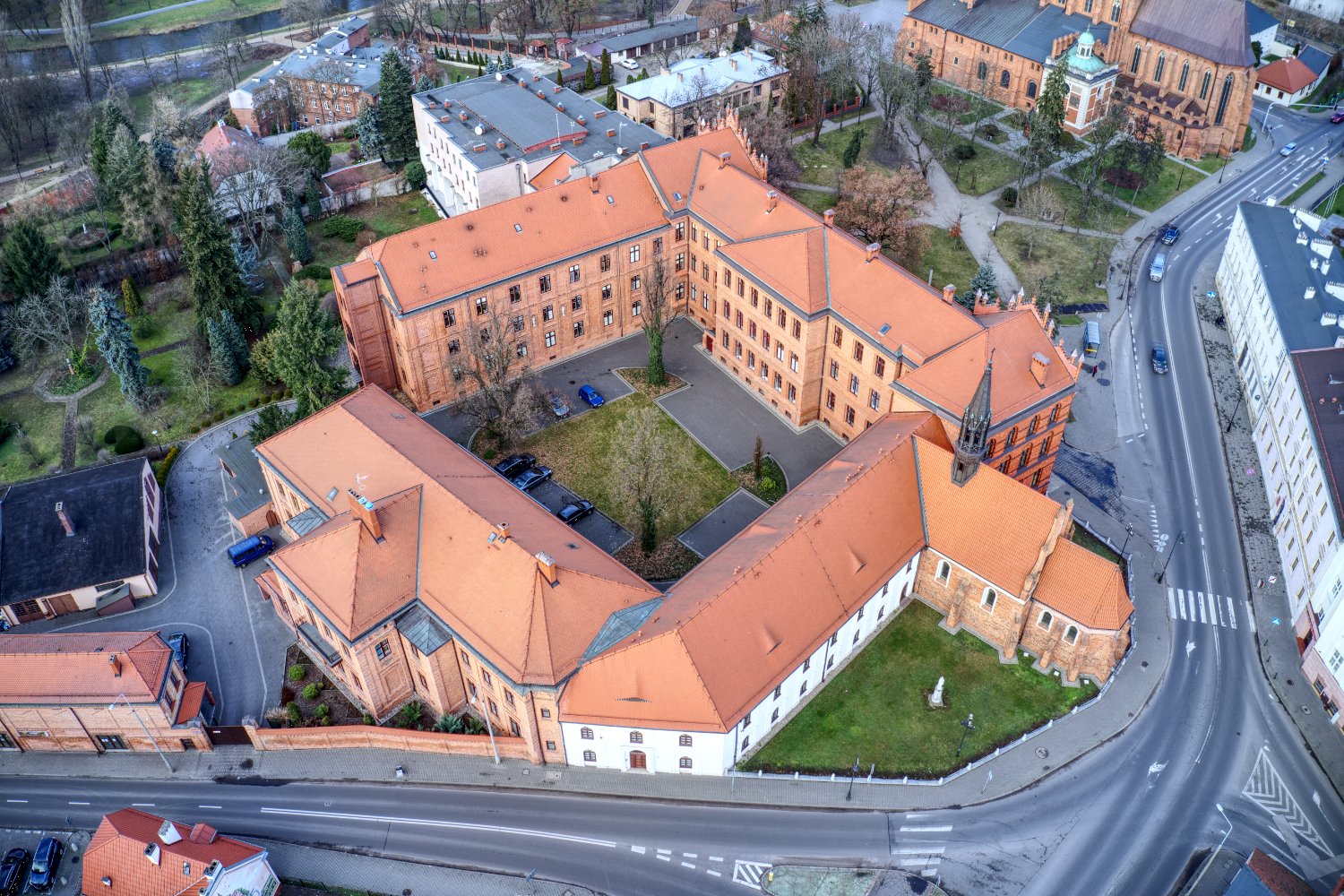
Seminary in Włocławek

Currently there are five universities or colleges or branches:

- Państwowa Szkoła Wyższa PSWW Włocławek/Higher State School in Włocławek PSWW (former PWSZ we Włocławku/ Higher Vocational State School PWSZ in Włocławek)
- Wyższa Szkoła Humanistyczno-Ekonomiczna WSHE Włocławek/ College of Humanistics and Economics WSHE in Włocławek
- Wyższa Szkoła Techniczna Włocławek / Higher Technical School in Włocławek
- Wyższa Szkoła Informatyki i Umiejętności Łódź, branch in Włocławek/ Higher School of IT and Skills
- Uniwersytet Mikołaja Kopernika w Toruniu Wydział Teologiczny we Włocławku (Wyższe Seminarium Duchowne Włocławek)

=== High schools ===
- I LO im. Ziemi Kujawskiej, ul. Mickiewicza 6 in Włocławek is one of the best high school in the city and in the Kuyavian-Pomeranian Voivodeship
- Publiczne Liceum im. Jana Długosza we Włocławku
- II LO im. Mikołaja Kopernika, ul. Urocza 3
- III LO im. Marii Konopnickiej, ul. Bechiego 1
- IV LO im. Kamila Krzysztofa Baczyńskiego, ul. Kaliska 108
- V LO im. Unii Europejskiej, ul. Toruńska 77/83/

== Twin areas ==
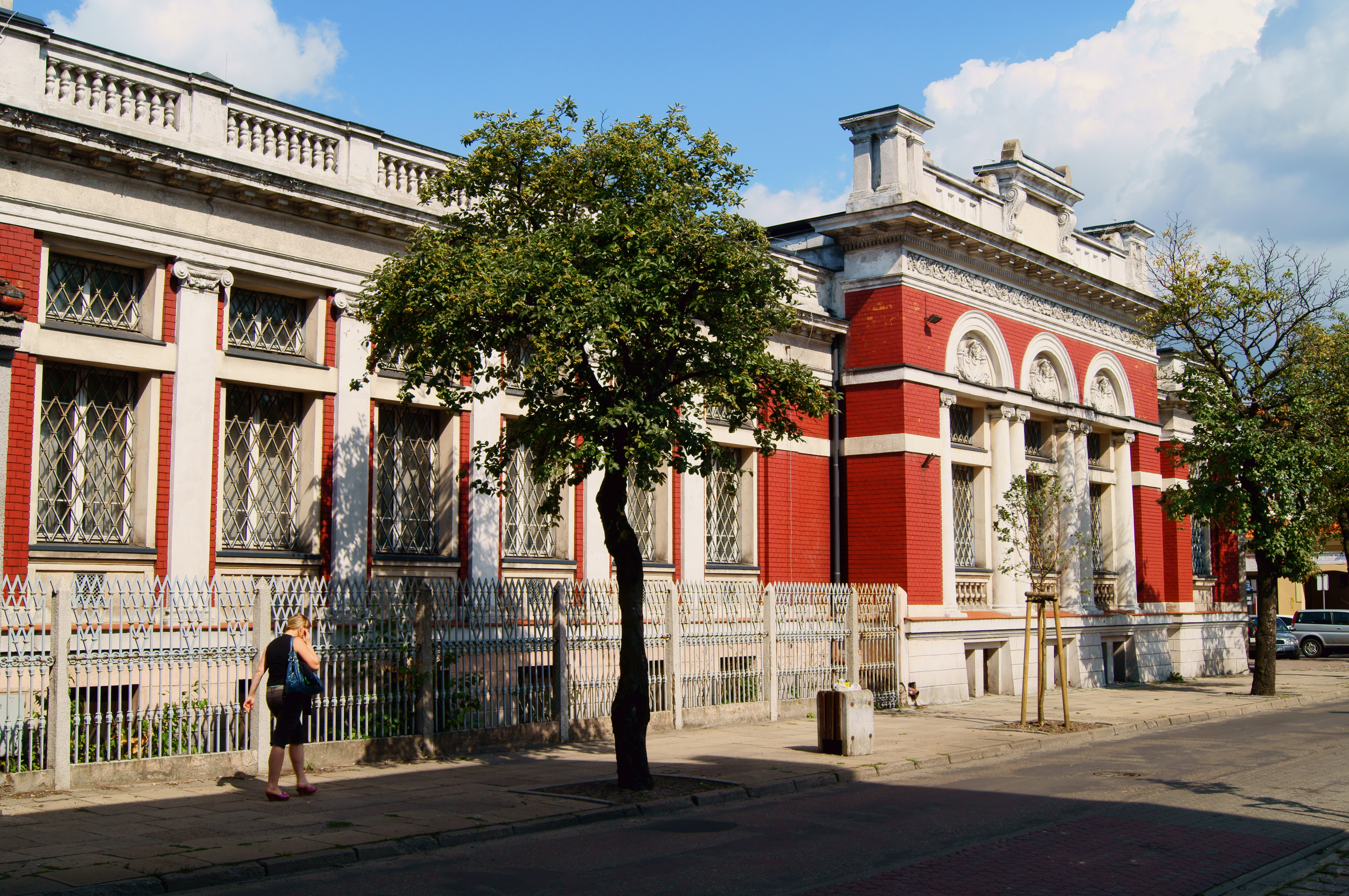
Old bank building on Żabia Street

This area has twinning with the following:

Mogilev, Belarus;
Bedford, United Kingdom;
Izmail, Ukraine;
Saint-Avold, France.

== Notable people ==
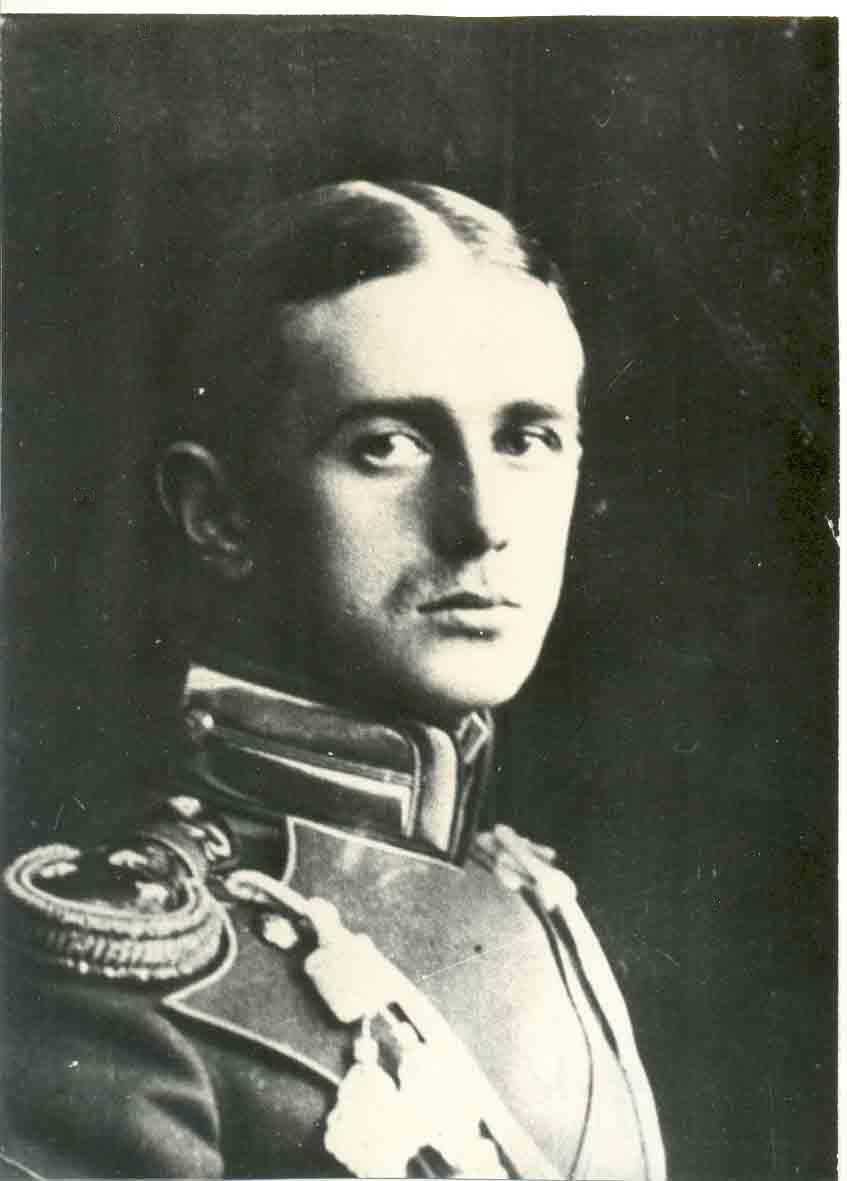
Jan Nagórski

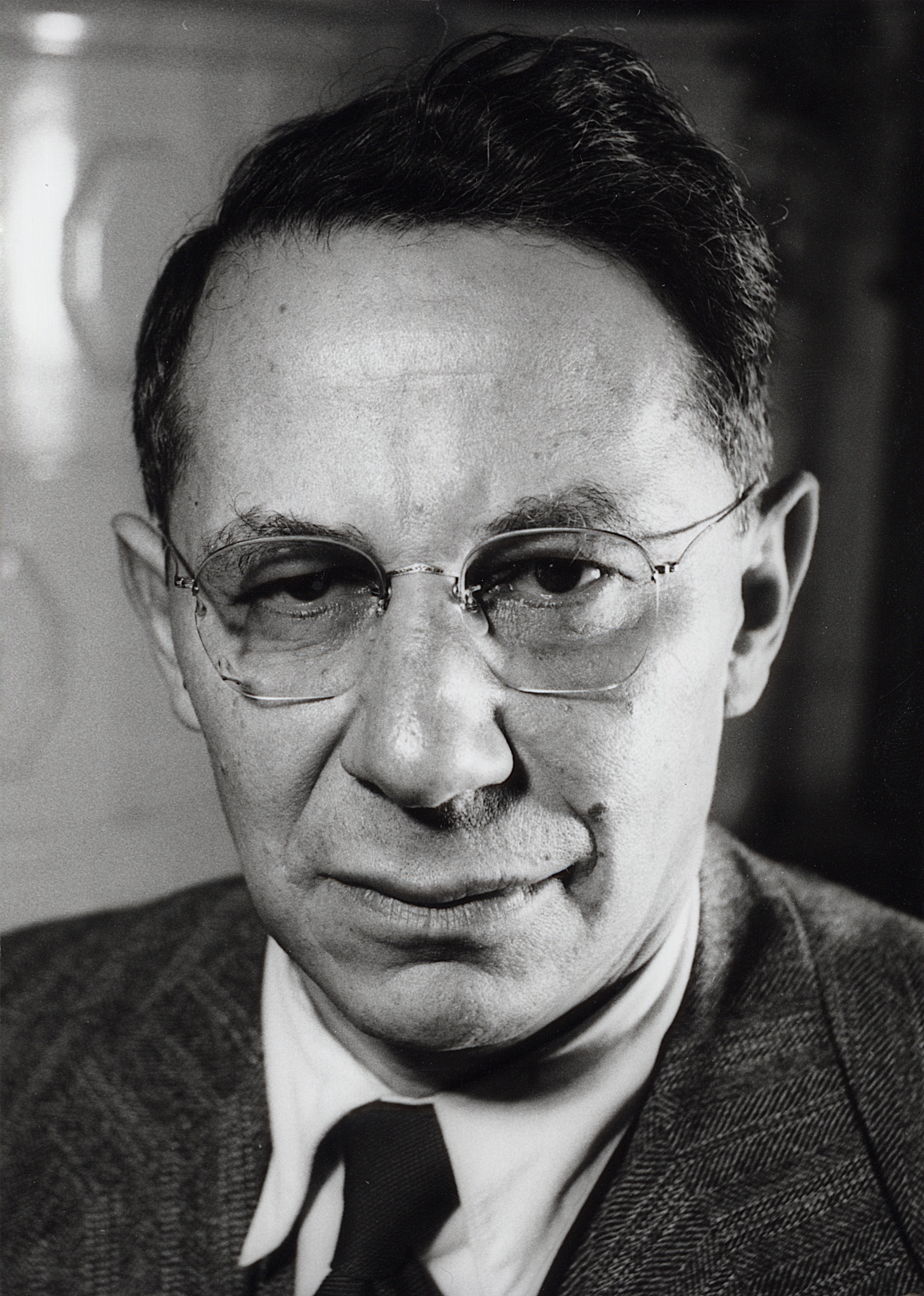
Tadeusz Reichstein

- Andrzej Kalwas (born 1936), Polish politician, businessman and solicitor
- Sholem Asch (1880 –1957), Polish-Jewish writer
- Katy Carr (born 1980), British singer, she spent childhood in Włocławek
- Nicolaus Copernicus (1473–1543), astronomer, may have studied in the cathedral school in Włocławek run by Mikołaj Wodka (Abstemius) in 1488–91; Wodka and his pupil probably built a sundial, that we can see on Cathedral Basilica of the Assumption of Mary,
- Anton Denikin (1872–1947), Russian Lieutenant General in the Imperial Russian Army
- Jerzy Engel (born 1952), former coach of Poland national football team
- Klaudia Kazimierska (born 2001), Polish middle-distance runner
- Roman Kozłowski (1889–1977), Polish paleontologist
- Francis de Sales Lewental (1839–1902), publisher
- Julian Marchlewski (1866–1925), Polish and German communist politician, born in Włocławek
- Leon Marchlewski (1869–1946), Polish chemist, one of the founders in the field of chlorophyll chemistry
- Aharon Megged (1920–2016), Israeli author, awarded the Israel Prize for literature
- Henryk Muszyński (born 1933), Polish bishop
- Jan Nagórski (1888–1976), Polish engineer and pioneer of aviation, the first man to fly over the North Pole
- Pawel Pogorzelski (born 1979), Polish-born Canadian cinematographer.
- Jerzy Popiełuszko (1947–1984), Polish Blessed Roman Catholic priest who became associated with the opposition Solidarity trade union in communist Poland. He was killed in 1984 by three agents of Służba Bezpieczeństwa (Security Service of the Ministry of Internal Affairs)
- Bernard Pullman (1919–1996), French theoretical quantum chemist
- Marcel Reich-Ranicki (1920–2013), German literary critic, known as "Pope of literature's critic", he had one of the most important TV-shows in Germany
- Tadeusz Reichstein (1897–1996), Polish-Swiss Nobel Prize Winner in chemistry
- Maryla Rodowicz (born 1945), popular Polish Singer
- Chaim F. Shatan (1924–2001), Canadian physician and psychiatrist who defined posttraumatic stress disorder
- Marie Steiner-von Sivers (1867–1948), German-Russian co-founder of Anthroposophy and the art of eurythmy
- Rachel Steinman Clarke (died 1944), violinist
- Jakub Świnka (?–1314), Polish bishop
- Henri Tajfel (1919–1982), Polish social psychologist
- Joseph Tykociński-Tykociner (1877–1969) Polish engineer and a pioneer of sound-on-film technology.
- Stefan Wyszyński (1901–1981), influential Polish bishop and cardinal, known as "Primate of the Millennium"
- Stanisław Zagajewski (c. 1927–2007) was a self-taught sculptor
