= Zagajewski =

Zagajewski (feminine Zagajewska) is a Polish surname. Notable people with the surname include:

- Adam Zagajewski (1945–2021), Polish poet, novelist, translator, and essayist
- Stanisław Zagajewski (1927–2007), Polish sculptor
- Tadeusz Zagajewski (1912–2010), Polish electronic engineer
