= Old Great Synagogue (Włocławek) =

Former synagogue in Włocławek, Poland

- Stara Wielka Synagoga
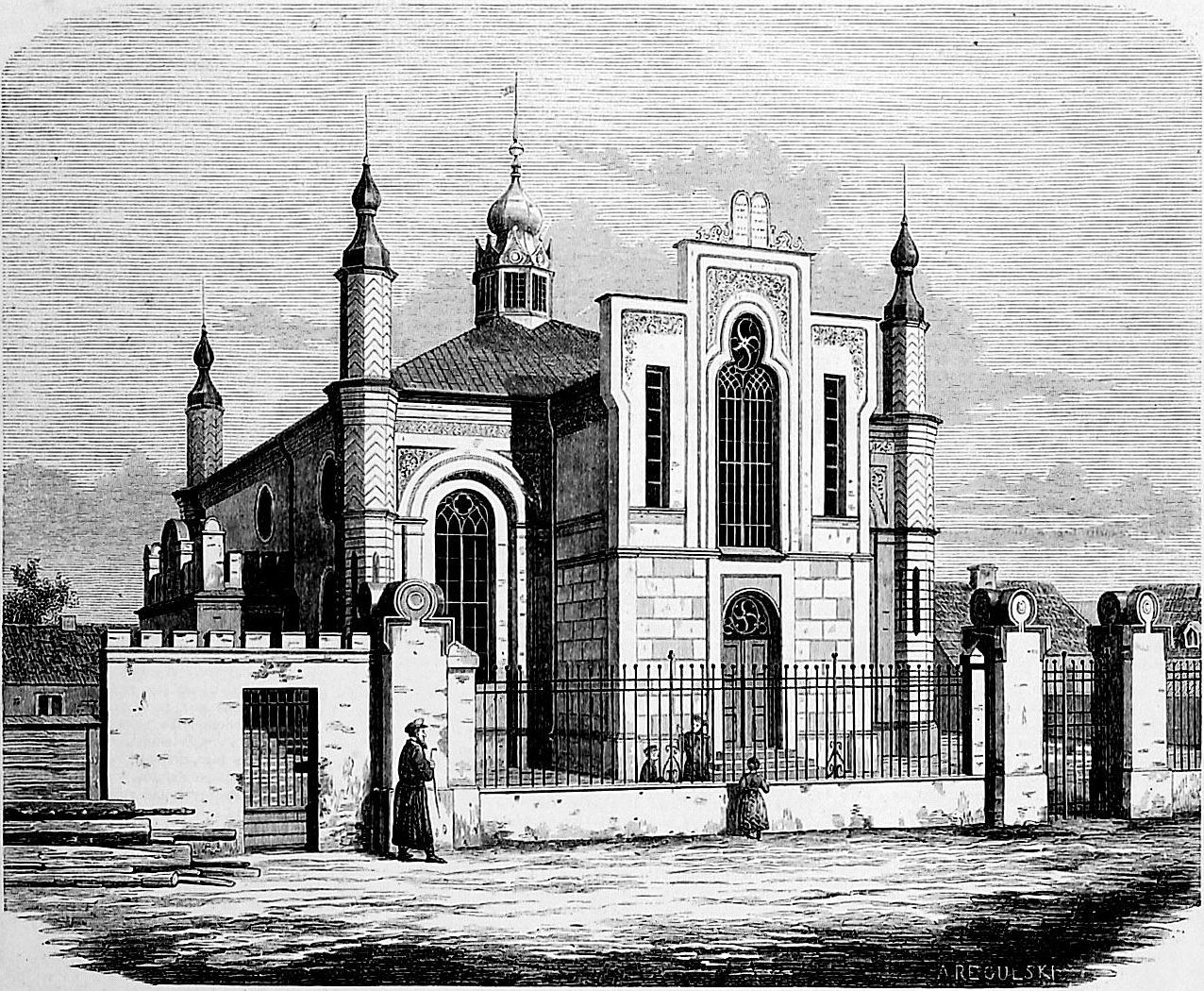
- The synagogue before its destruction

Religion
- Affiliation: Judaism
- Ecclesiastical or organisational status: Synagogue
- Status: Destroyed

Location
- Location: Żabia Street 14, Włocławek
- Country: Poland
- Interactive map of Old Great Synagogue
- Coordinates: 52.658306°N 19.0685°E

Architecture
- Architect: Franciszek Tournelle
- Type: Synagogue
- Style: Moorish Revival
- Completed: 1854
- Destroyed: October 1939
- Capacity: 1,000 worshippers

The Old Great Synagogue (Polish: Stara Wielka Synagoga) was a synagogue at 14 Żabia Street in Włocławek, a city in what is now the Kuyavian-Pomeranian Voivodeship of Poland. Built between 1847 and 1854, (Note: Virtual Shtetl's history of the Jewish community gives the construction dates as 1847–1854, while its separate entry on the synagogue gives 1848–1854.) it was designed by Franciszek Tournelle in the Moorish Revival style. German occupying forces burned it down in October 1939.

== History ==
The building replaced an earlier synagogue erected on Żabia Street in 1820. Completed in 1854, it accommodated approximately 1,000 worshippers.

Following the German invasion of Poland, the synagogue was burned down in October 1939. Its ruins were cleared in 1940, after the establishment of the Włocławek ghetto.

After the World War II, the site was used as a children's playground. In 1955, it was acquired by the Directorate for the Construction of Workers' Housing Estates, which subsequently erected a residential building at 14 Żabia Street.

== Architecture ==
The synagogue had a square plan with rectangular annexes containing the main entrance, the women's entrance and a staircase. Its distinguishing features included octagonal corner turrets and a principal façade crowned by the tablets of the Ten Commandments. The interior was decorated with allegorical murals. Architectural historians have identified the Dresden synagogue as an influence on its design.

== See also ==
- History of the Jews in Poland
