= Stanisław Zagajewski =

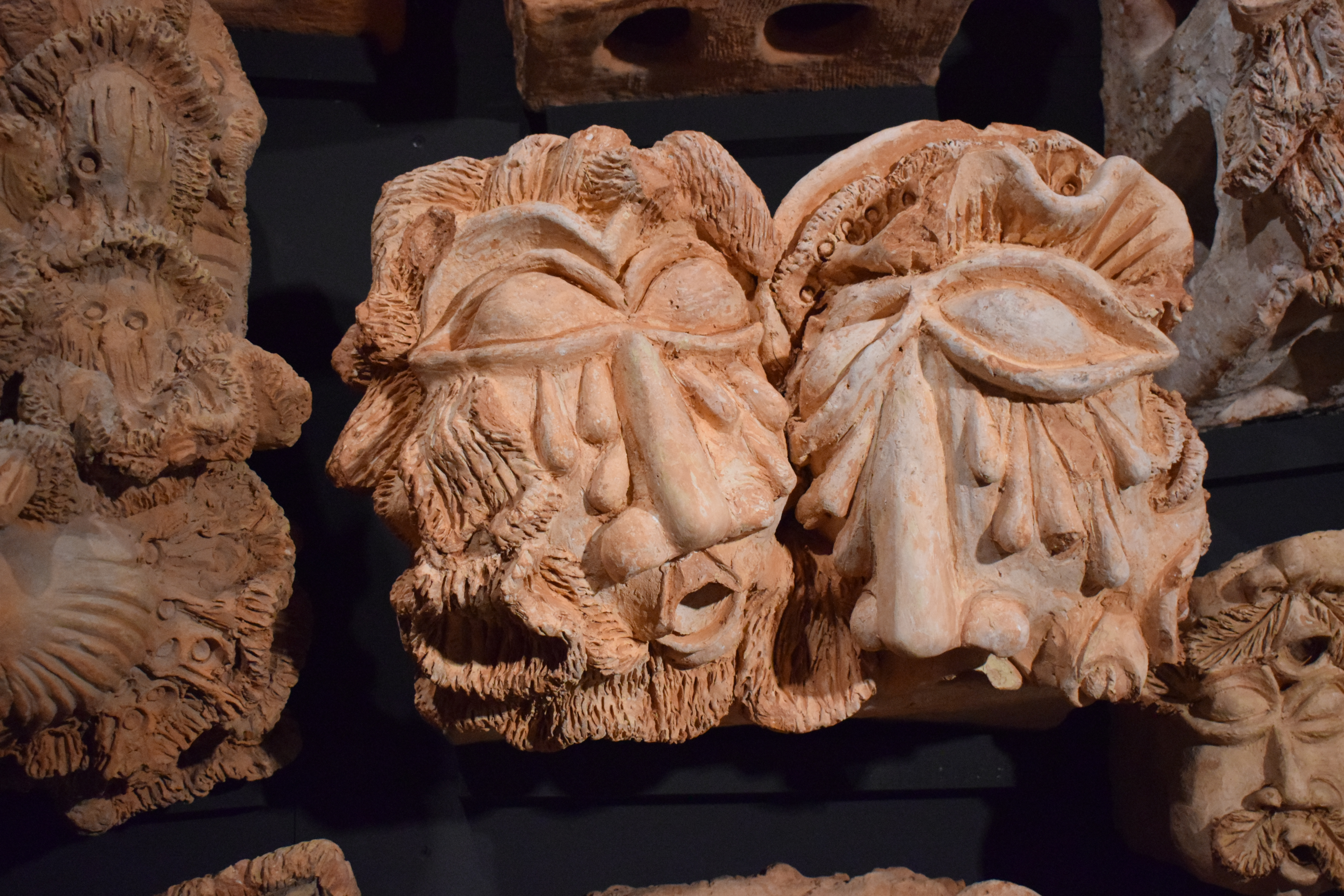
Sculptures of Zagajewski on exhibition in the Collection de l'art brut in Laussane

Stanisław Zagajewski (c. 1927 – 4 April 2008 in Włocławek) was a Polish self-taught sculptor.

Zagajewski was abandoned in winter 1929 on the doorstep of St. Barbara Church in Warsaw, so his date of birth as well as his name and surname were assigned to him. He grew up in an orphanage and never finished primary school. He worked i.a. as a cook, gardener, bookbinder, tailor and construction worker helping in rebuilding Warsaw till 1952. Since 1963 he lived in Włocławek devoting himself to sculpting. During his cooperation with Cepelia (a state company purchasing folk art objects from craftsmanship cooperatives) he learned how to fire ceramics.

His clay sculptures have very decorative forms and surprising compositions. He started with carving figures of birds, then fantastic creatures, and later focused on sculpting multi-element altars full of angels and demons. He was aware of his talent and often compared himself to Michelangelo. He had many individual exhibitions and his sculptures are in private and museum collections, for example in the Collection de l’art brut in Lausanne. Over 120 exhibits are displayed in the Museum of the Kuyavian and Dobrzyń Region in Włocławek. However, despite notability Zagajewski lived and created in very difficult conditions.

Several documentaries were shot about Zagajewski, including one in 2006.
