= Mercator Medical =

Polish company

Mercator Medical S.A.
- Traded as: WSE: MRC; WIG-CHEMIA
- Industry: Production and distribution
- Founded: 1996
- Headquarters: ul. H. Modrzejewskiej 30, 31-327 Kraków, Poland
- Key people: (CEO)
- Products: Disposable medical devices: medical gloves, dressings, disposable clothing, surgical drapes
- Net income: 930 mln zł (2020)
- Number of employees: over 1200 (2018)
- Website: http://mercatormedical.eu/

Mercator Medical S.A. is a Polish company established in 1996 in Kraków, involved in the manufacture of disposable personal protective equipment for medical purposes and surgical drapes (medical gloves, disposable medical devices, dressings, and protective products made of non-woven fabric).

== Introduction ==
The company dates back to 1989, when Piotr and Wiesław Żyznowski started a new business under the name Mercator Żyznowski i Spółka [General Partnership]. In 1993, it was transformed into a joint stock company. Further development made it necessary to divide the company into three independent partnerships. As a result, the following entities were established: Mercator Medical S.A., in 1996, and Mercator Papier S.A. and Mercator Poligrafia S.A., in 1998. The company started its business operations by distributing medical and protective gloves. Over the course of time, the product line was extended to include dressings, disposable clothing and surgical drapes. The company holds the following certificates: ISO 9001:2000 and ISO 13485:2003. In 2011 these were extended to include the manufacture of medical examining gloves and dressings, purchasing, storing, packaging and customising, as well as domestic sales and export of medical products and personal protective equipment. Mercator Medical is the first polish company which has done industrial investment in Thailand. Company has 1% of sales of medical gloves globally, delivers medical products to 45 countries in the world.

== Structure and ownership ==
Mercator Medical have their own production plant in Thailand. The company's headquarters are in Kraków. Mercator Medical Group comprises the following entities: the Polish parent company Mercator Medical S.A. and its subsidiaries: Mercator Medical TOV in Ukraine, Mercator Medical s.r.l. in Romania, Mercator Medical J.V. partnership in Russia, Mercator Medical (Thailand) Ltd. in Thailand, and a branch of Mercator Medical S.A. in Hungary.

The manufacturing part of the company is located in Thailand, as this location offers access to an important raw material, natural rubber (latex). The objective behind the purchase of a production plant for medical gloves in Thailand was to ensure the secure supply of the key raw material required for the manufacturing of latex gloves; this was also the first industrial investment by a Polish company in that country. The company sells their products directly on the global market and delivers them to each of the individual entities that comprise Mercator Medical Group.

The company has a network of commercial partners in more than 40 countries and supplies products primarily for health care units, industrial plants, and pharmaceutical wholesalers.

On 18 October 2013, the company published its prospectus. On 21 November 2013, the company debuted on the Warsaw Stock Exchange.

The company's central warehouse and trade office opened in 1999 in Stary Brześć. Since that time, Mercator S.A. have opened offices in other countries, including Mercator Medical TOV in Ukraine (in 2005), and later, Mercator Medical s.r.l. in Romania and Mercator Medical Kft in Hungary. In 2015, a new partnership was opened in Russia, under the name Mercator Medical J.V.

As of 7 April 2015, Anabaza Ltd. is the principal stockholder of Mercator Medical S.A., with 65.79% of shares.

All other shares are held by private shareholders and Pioneer Pekao Investment Management S.A. as follows:

- Wiesław Żyznowski – 8.07 %
- Monika Sitko – 1.90 %
- Pioneer Pekao Investment Management S.A. – 8.30 %
- Other shareholders – 16.46 %

== Products ==
Each of the individual products in the catalogue has been developed over the course of time, beginning in 1997. That year saw the start of manufacturing and distributing the company's own brands of Comfort, Santex, and Proster medical gloves. Then, in 2012, the available product line was expanded with the inclusion of surgical draping sets and specialised surgical sheets. This period of time saw the introduction of Comfort PF and DermaGel powder-free examination gloves with low latex content, and Vinylex vinyl medical examination gloves, constituting the first alternative to latex gloves in Poland. In 2005, the company began cooperation with Ansell Healthcare in the scope of distribution. In that same year, the product line was expanded with the inclusion of Orthopeg, Microtex, Gynoglove, and Syntec NEOPRENE specialist surgical gloves, as well as Texident gloves designed for dentists, gloves designed for procedures involving increased risk of infection, ProHand sterile examination gloves, and powder-free vinyl gloves. The decision to purchase the medical gloves production plant in Thailand resulted in the introduction of a new group of products, i.e. dressings that included the following: gauze compresses, non-woven fabric compresses, high-absorbency compresses, adhesive tapes on various types of carriers, dressings for the fastening of cannula, surgical dressings, plaster bandages, stabilising supports, and net bandages.
