= Bodzia =

- Village
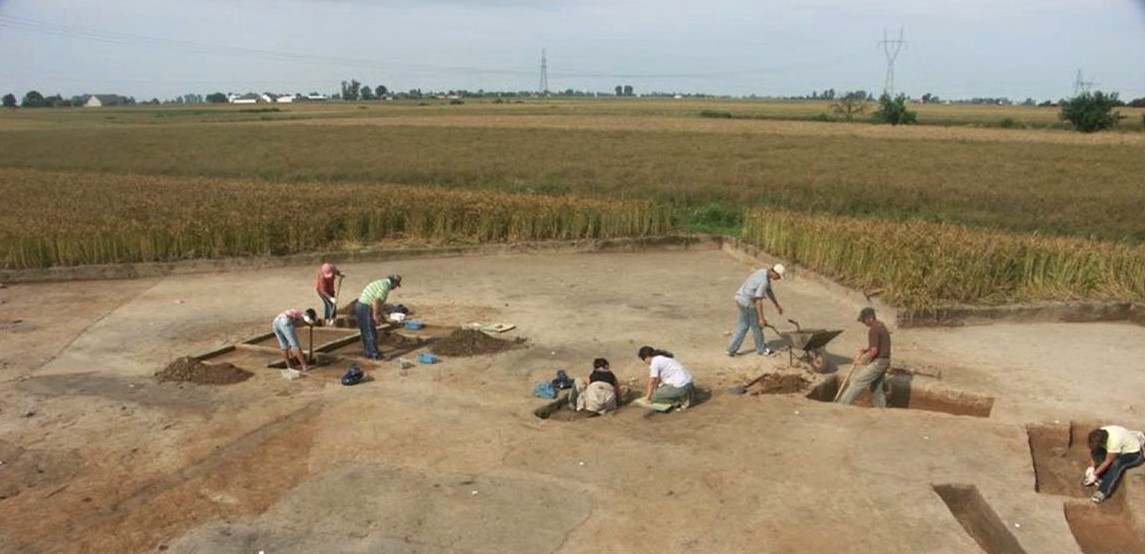
- Archaeological excavations, 2007

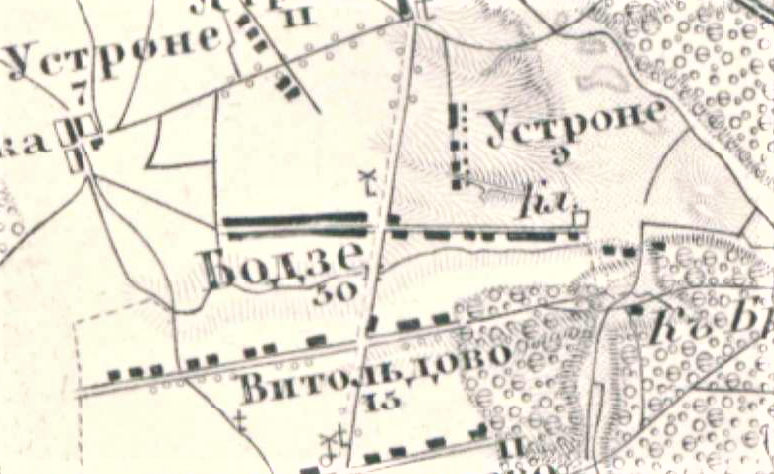
- Detail of a Russian map of the village, 1872

- Location within Poland
- Coordinates: 52°42′19″N 18°53′09″E
- Country: Poland
- Voivodeship: Kuyavian-Pomeranian
- Powiat: Włocławek
- Gmina: Lubanie
- First settled: After 12th century

Area
  - Total: 131 ha (320 acres)
- Postal code: 87-732
- Area code: +48 (54)

Bodzia [ˈbɔd͡ʑa] is a village in the administrative district of Gmina Lubanie, within Włocławek County, Kuyavian-Pomeranian Voivodeship, in north-central Poland. Bodzia is also known for an archaeological find dated to the late 10th Century and early 11th Century containing graves of elite warriors. The grave goods suggest links to Nordic and Kievan Rus culture. The village is also home to a German World War II cemetery.

== Geography ==
The village is a perfect example of a linear settlement akin to a German Zeilendorf - a type of linear settlement with sparser house density. Most of the houses are located to the south of the main road connecting Sarnówka with Studniska. Several hundred metres to the south of the village lies the construction site of the A1 motorway connecting Silesia, Łódź, Toruń and Gdańsk (under construction as of 2013).

According to the Geographical Dictionary of the Kingdom of Poland of 1900, the village had 312 inhabitants and covered the area of 277 morgen, belonging to the Warsaw Governorate. Between 1975 and 1998 it was part of the Włocławek Voivodeship.
