= Wincenty =

Wincenty is a given name. Notable people with the name include:

- Ryszard Wincenty Berwiński (1817–1879), Polish poet
- Wincenty Budzyński (1815–1866), Polish politician agent and Polish–French chess master
- Wincenty de Lesseur (born 1745), eighteenth-century Polish painter
- Wincenty Dunin-Marcinkiewicz (c. 1808 – 1884), Belarusian writer, poet, dramatist and social activist
- Stefan Wincenty Frelichowski (1913–1945), Polish priest, scout and patron of Polish Scouts
- Wincenty Godlewski or Vincent Hadleŭski (1898–1942), Belarusian Roman Catholic priest, publicist and politician
- Wincenty Gostkowski (1807–1884), lawyer and associate in the watchmaker Patek Philippe & Co. in Geneva, Switzerland
- Wincenty Kadłubek (1161–1223), thirteenth century Bishop of Cracow and historian of Poland
- Wincenty Korwin Gosiewski (1620–1662), Polish-Lithuanian politician and military commander, a notable member of the szlachta
- Wincenty Kowalski (1892–1984), Polish military commander and a general of the Polish Army
- Wincenty Krasiński (1782–1858), Polish nobleman (szlachcic), political activist and military leader
- Wincenty Lewoniuk, one of the Pratulin Martyrs, 13 Greek Catholic (Uniate) believers killed by the Russian Army in 1874
- Wincenty Lutosławski (1863–1954), Polish philosopher, author, and member of the Polish National League
- Wincenty Niemojowski (1784–1834), Polish political activist in Congress Poland
- Wincenty of Kielcza (born 1200), Polish canon in Cracow, a poet writing in Latin, composer, member of the Dominican Order
- Wincenty Okołowicz (1906–1979), Polish geographer and an expert in geomorphology and climatology
- Wincenty Pol (1807–1872), Polish poet and geographer
- Hieronim Wincenty Radziwiłł (1759–1786), Polish-Lithuanian nobleman and Knight of the Order of the White Eagle
- Wincenty Rzymowski (1883–1950), Polish politician and writer
- Wincenty Witos (1874–1945), prominent member of the Polish People's Party (PSL) from 1895, and leader of its "Piast" faction from 1913
- Wincenty Wodzinowski (1866–1940), Polish painter
- Wincenty Zakrzewski (1844–1918), Polish historian

== See also ==
- Vincent
- Wincenta
- Wincentynów
- Wincentów (disambiguation)
- Winsen (disambiguation)
