= Lubański =

Lubański (masculine) or Lubańska (feminine) may refer to:

- Lubanski (surname)
- Lubań County (Polish: powiat lubański), a place in south-western Poland
- Henryków Lubański, a village in Lubań County
- Włoszyca Lubańska, a village in Włocławek County
