= Skrzynki, Włocławek County =

Skrzynki
- Village
- Location within Poland
- Coordinates: 52°30′N 19°19′E
- Country: Poland
- Voivodeship: Kuyavian-Pomeranian
- County: Włocławek
- Gmina: Baruchowo
- Population: 160

Skrzynki [ˈskʂɨŋki] is a village in the administrative district of Gmina Baruchowo, within Włocławek County, Kuyavian-Pomeranian Voivodeship, in north-central Poland.
