= Zosin, Włocławek County =

Zosin
- Village
- Location within Poland
- Coordinates: 52°47′N 18°50′E
- Country: Poland
- Voivodeship: Kuyavian-Pomeranian
- County: Włocławek
- Gmina: Lubanie

Zosin [ˈzɔɕin] is a village in the administrative district of Gmina Lubanie, within Włocławek County, Kuyavian-Pomeranian Voivodeship, in north-central Poland.
