= Kurowo-Parcele =

- Village
- Location within Poland
- Coordinates: 52°27′51″N 19°15′54″E
- Country: Poland
- Voivodeship: Kuyavian-Pomeranian
- County: Włocławek
- Gmina: Baruchowo

Kurowo-Parcele [kuˈrɔvɔ parˈt͡sɛlɛ] is a village in the administrative district of Gmina Baruchowo, within Włocławek County, Kuyavian-Pomeranian Voivodeship, in north-central Poland.
