= Gmina Kowal =

Gmina Kowal Kowal Commune
- Gmina
- Coat of arms
- Interactive map of Gmina Kowal
- Coordinates (Kowal): 52°31′57″N 19°8′42″E
- Country: Poland
- Voivodeship: Kuyavian-Pomeranian
- County: Włocławek County
- Seat: Kowal

Area
  - Total: 114.75 km^{2} (44.31 sq mi)

Population (2006)
  - Total: 4,089
  - Density: 35.63/km^{2} (92.29/sq mi)
- Time zone: UTC+1 (CET)
  - Summer (DST): UTC+2 (CEST)
- Vehicle registration: CWL

Gmina Kowal is a rural gmina in Włocławek County, Kuyavian-Pomeranian Voivodeship, in central Poland. Its seat is the town of Kowal, although the town is not part of the territory of the gmina.

The gmina covers an area of 114.75 square kilometres (44.31 sq mi), and as of 2006 its total population is 4,089.

The gmina contains part of the protected area called Gostynin-Włocławek Landscape Park.

== Villages ==
Gmina Kowal contains the villages and settlements of Bogusławice, Czerniewiczki, Dąbrówka, Dębniaki, Dobrzelewice, Dziardonice, Gołaszewo, Grabkowo, Grodztwo, Kępka Szlachecka, Krzewent, Nakonowo, Przydatki Gołaszewskie, Rakutowo, Strzały, Unisławice, Więsławice and Więsławice-Parcele.

== Neighbouring gminas ==
Gmina Kowal is bordered by the town of Kowal and by the gminas of Baruchowo, Choceń, Lubień Kujawski and Włocławek.
