= Lech Kuropatwiński =

Polish politician (1947–2022)

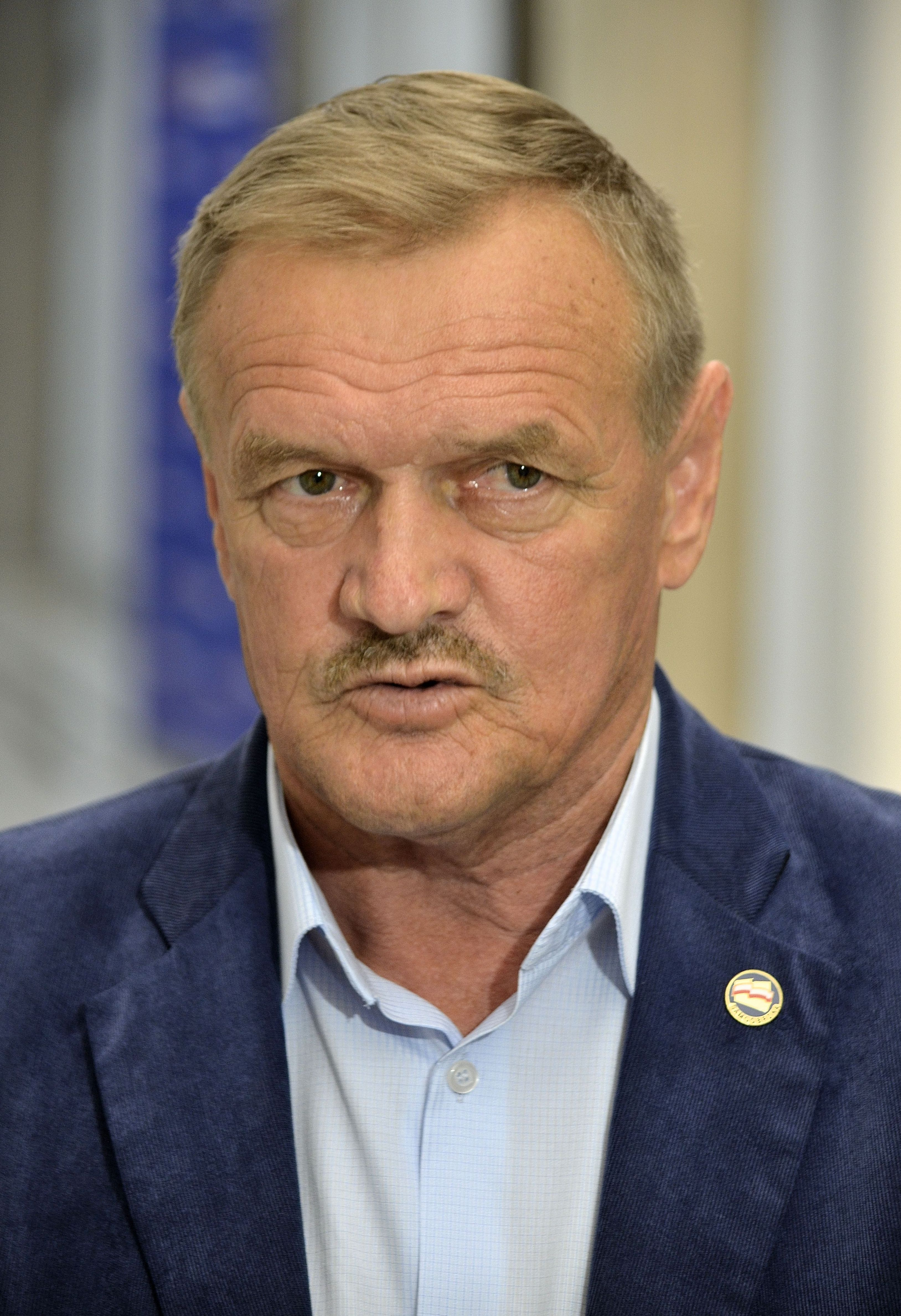

Member of Sejm 2005-2007
- In office 25 September 2005 – 2007

Personal details
- Born: 4 July 1947 Grodno, Włocławek County, Poland
- Died: 20 December 2022 (aged 75) Bydgoszcz, Poland
- Party: Samoobrona

Lech Stefan Kuropatwiński (4 July 1947 – 20 December 2022) was a Polish politician. He was elected to Sejm on 25 September 2005, getting 6,115 votes in 5 Toruń district as a candidate of the Self-Defence of the Republic of Poland list.

Kuropatwiński was also a member of Sejm from 2001 to 2005. He had been the leader of Self-Defence of the Republic of Poland from 2012.

== See also ==
- Members of Polish Sejm 2005-2007
