= Janowice, Włocławek County =

Janowice
- Village
- Location within Poland
- Coordinates: 52°44′N 18°52′E
- Country: Poland
- Voivodeship: Kuyavian-Pomeranian
- County: Włocławek
- Gmina: Lubanie

Janowice [janɔˈvit͡sɛ] is a village in the administrative district of Gmina Lubanie, within Włocławek County, Kuyavian-Pomeranian Voivodeship, in north-central Poland.
