= Tadzin, Kuyavian-Pomeranian Voivodeship =

Tadzin
- Village
- Location within Poland
- Coordinates: 52°45′N 18°51′E
- Country: Poland
- Voivodeship: Kuyavian-Pomeranian
- County: Włocławek
- Gmina: Lubanie

Tadzin [ˈtad͡ʑin] is a village in the administrative district of Gmina Lubanie, within Włocławek County, Kuyavian-Pomeranian Voivodeship, in north-central Poland.
