= Dzierzązna =

Dzierzązna may refer to the following places:

- Dzierzązna, Poddębice County in Łódź Voivodeship (central Poland)
- Dzierzązna, Sieradz County in Łódź Voivodeship (central Poland)
- Dzierzązna, Masovian Voivodeship (east-central Poland)
