= Kępka Szlachecka =

- Village
- Location within Poland
- Coordinates: 52°29′24″N 19°6′36″E
- Country: Poland
- Voivodeship: Kuyavian-Pomeranian
- County: Włocławek
- Gmina: Kowal

Kępka Szlachecka [ˈkɛmpka ʂlaˈxɛt͡ska] is a village in the administrative district of Gmina Kowal, within Włocławek County, Kuyavian-Pomeranian Voivodeship, in north-central Poland. However a part of the village lies within Gmina Choceń.
