= Gołaszewo, Kuyavian-Pomeranian Voivodeship =

Gołaszewo
- Village
- Location within Poland
- Coordinates: 52°33′N 19°5′E
- Country: Poland
- Voivodeship: Kuyavian-Pomeranian
- County: Włocławek
- Gmina: Kowal
- Population (approx.): 370

Gołaszewo [ɡɔwaˈʂɛvɔ] is a village in the administrative district of Gmina Kowal, within Włocławek County, Kuyavian-Pomeranian Voivodeship, in north-central Poland.

The village has an approximate population of 370.
