= Unisławice, Kuyavian-Pomeranian Voivodeship =

Unisławice
- Village
- Location within Poland
- Coordinates: 52°28′N 19°9′E
- Country: Poland
- Voivodeship: Kuyavian-Pomeranian
- County: Włocławek
- Gmina: Kowal
- Population: 320

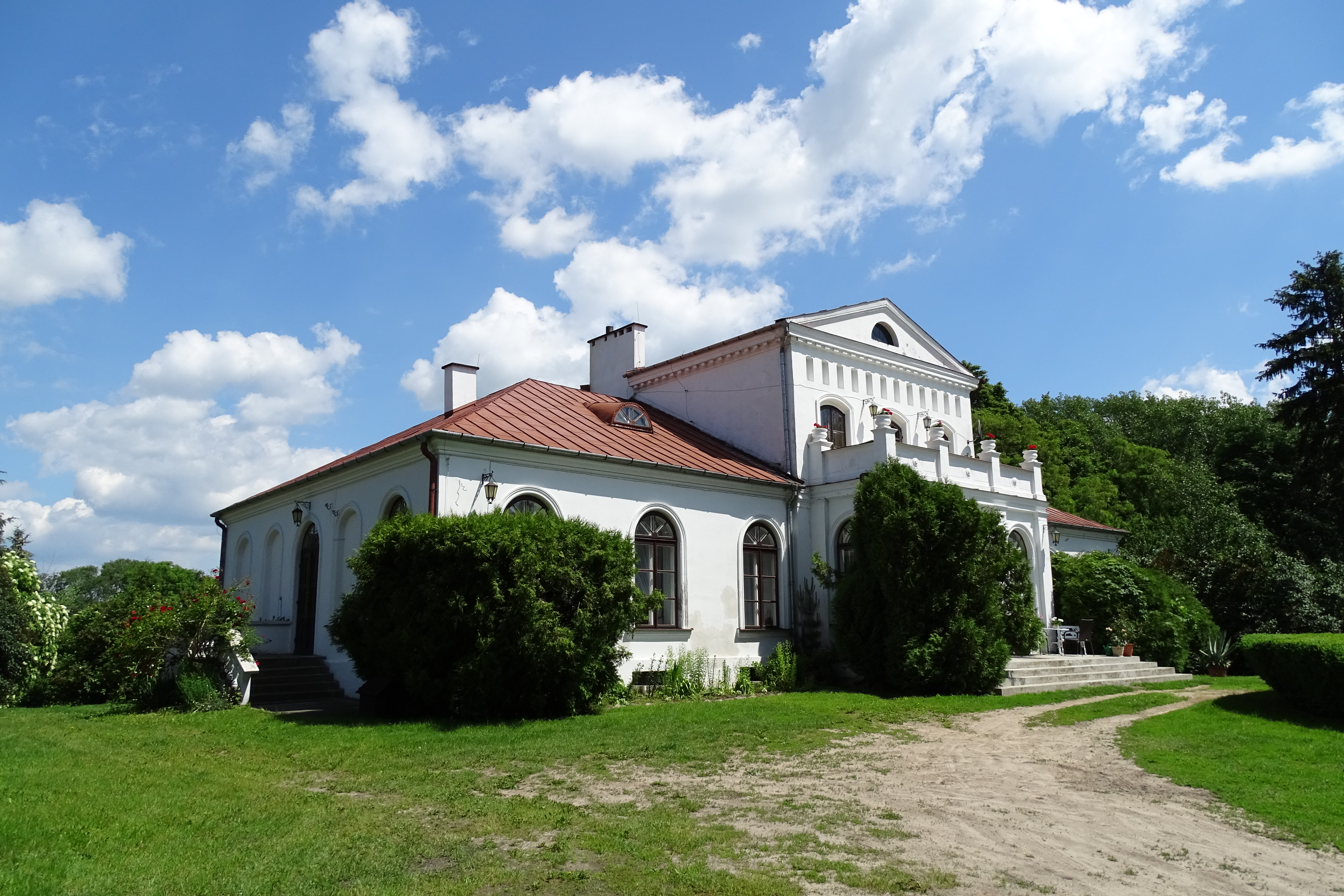
The manor house. Built turn of the 18th century.

Unisławice [uniswaˈvit͡sɛ] is a village in the administrative district of Gmina Kowal, within Włocławek County, Kuyavian-Pomeranian Voivodeship, in north-central Poland.
