= Zawada-Piaski =

- Village
- Location within Poland
- Coordinates: 52°28′45″N 19°17′32″E
- Country: Poland
- Voivodeship: Kuyavian-Pomeranian
- County: Włocławek
- Gmina: Baruchowo
- Population: 60

Zawada-Piaski (Polish pronunciation: [zaˈvada ˈpjaskʲi]) is a village in the administrative district of Gmina Baruchowo, within Włocławek County, Kuyavian-Pomeranian Voivodeship, in north-central Poland.
