= Nowy Duninów =

- Village
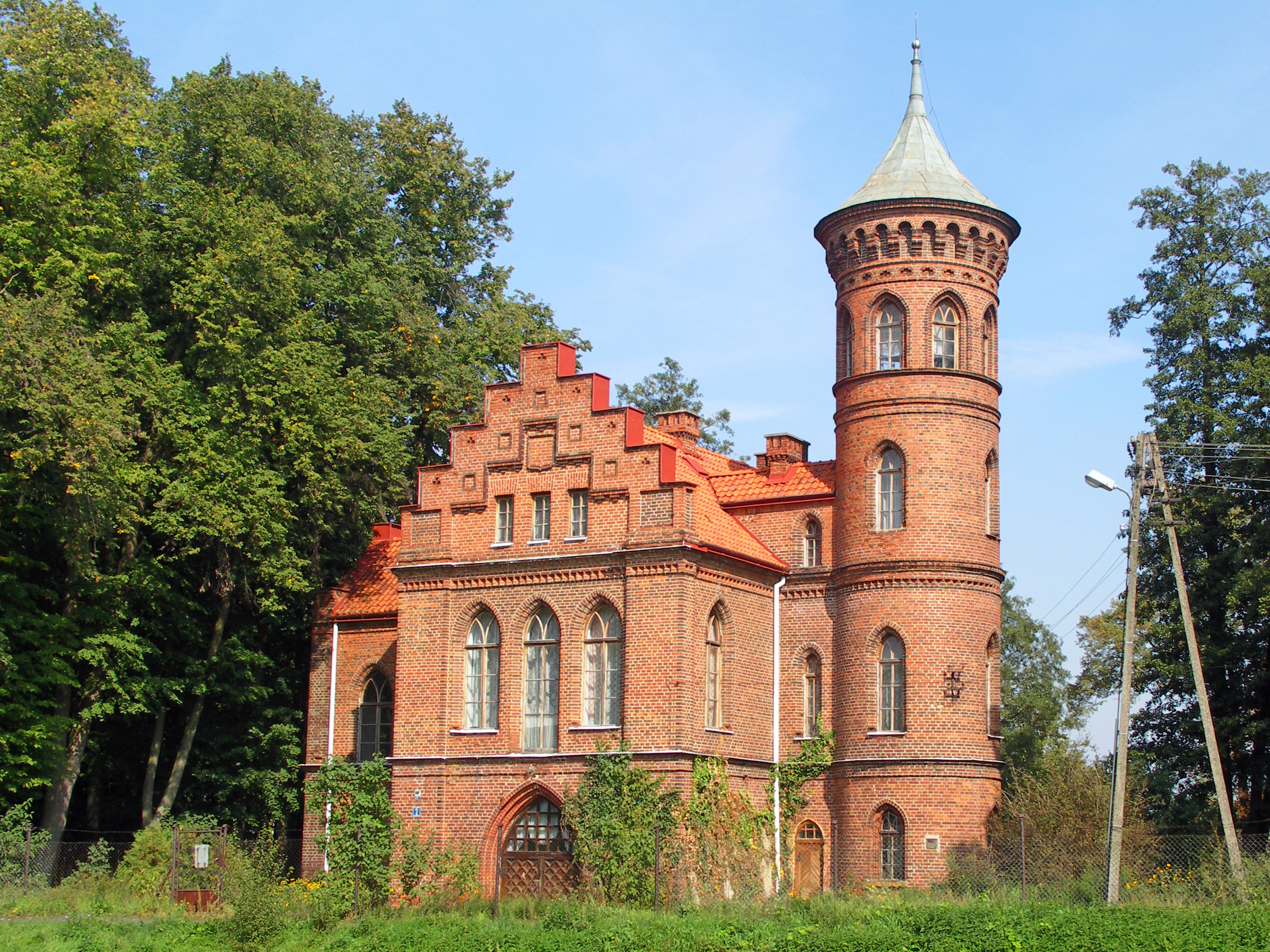
- Neo-Gothic chateau in Nowy Duninów

- Coat of arms

- Location within Poland
- Coordinates: 52°34′49″N 19°28′24″E
- Country: Poland
- Voivodeship: Masovian
- County: Płock
- Gmina: Nowy Duninów

Nowy Duninów [ˈnɔvɨ duˈninuf] is a village in Płock County, Masovian Voivodeship, in east-central Poland. It is the seat of the gmina (administrative district) called Gmina Nowy Duninów, a rural area.

== Geography ==
Nowy Duninów is located on the Vistula northwest of Stary Duninów (Old Duninów), at the intersection of Route 62 (DK-62) and Route 573 (DW-573). It has port facilities, which are now mostly for water-sports enthusiasts.

== History ==
A sugar mill was founded at Nowy Duninów in 1846 for processing sugar beets, as it had a good port for agricultural transport. Among the other industries in the village in the early 20th century were distilleries, a brickyard, a sawmill and fish farms.

=== Castle ===
It's Neogothic "pocket castle" was built from 1835 to 1840 by Karol Albrecht Wilhelm Baron von Ike, and served various functions over its long history from being a chapel, a cinema and a hotel. In 1959 it became a "registered monument". By the late 1980s it had fallen into disrepair when in 1992 it was remodeled as a private residence.
