= Więsławice-Parcele =

- Village
- Location within Poland
- Coordinates: 52°29′53″N 19°11′40″E
- Country: Poland
- Voivodeship: Kuyavian-Pomeranian
- County: Włocławek
- Gmina: Kowal

Więsławice-Parcele [vjɛ̃swaˈvit͡sɛ parˈt͡sɛlɛ] is a village in the administrative district of Gmina Kowal, within Włocławek County, Kuyavian-Pomeranian Voivodeship, in north-central Poland.
