= Strzały =

- Village
- Location within Poland
- Coordinates: 52°29′N 19°10′E
- Country: Poland
- Voivodeship: Kuyavian-Pomeranian
- County: Włocławek
- Gmina: Kowal

Strzały [ˈstʂawɨ] is a village in the administrative district of Gmina Kowal, within Włocławek County, Kuyavian-Pomeranian Voivodeship, in north-central Poland.
