= Patrówek =

- Village
- Location within Poland
- Coordinates: 52°28′11″N 19°19′12″E
- Country: Poland
- Voivodeship: Kuyavian-Pomeranian
- County: Włocławek
- Gmina: Baruchowo

Patrówek [paˈtruvɛk] is a village in the administrative district of Gmina Baruchowo, within Włocławek County, Kuyavian-Pomeranian Voivodeship, in north-central Poland.
