= Zapomianowo =

- Village
- Location within Poland
- Coordinates: 52°45′23″N 18°52′21″E
- Country: Poland
- Voivodeship: Kuyavian-Pomeranian
- County: Włocławek
- Gmina: Lubanie
- Population: 80

Zapomianowo [zapɔmjaˈnɔvɔ] is a village in the administrative district of Gmina Lubanie, within Włocławek County, Kuyavian-Pomeranian Voivodeship, in north-central Poland.
