= Zakrzewo, Gmina Baruchowo =

Zakrzewo
- Village
- Location within Poland
- Coordinates: 52°27′16″N 19°18′07″E
- Country: Poland
- Voivodeship: Kuyavian-Pomeranian
- County: Włocławek
- Gmina: Baruchowo

Zakrzewo [zaˈkʂɛvɔ] is a village in the administrative district of Gmina Baruchowo, within Włocławek County, Kuyavian-Pomeranian Voivodeship, in north-central Poland.
