= Świątkowice, Kuyavian-Pomeranian Voivodeship =

Świątkowice
- Village
- Location within Poland
- Coordinates: 52°30′N 19°13′E
- Country: Poland
- Voivodeship: Kuyavian-Pomeranian
- County: Włocławek
- Gmina: Baruchowo

Świątkowice (Polish: [ɕfjɔntkɔˈvit͡sɛ]) is a village in the administrative district of Gmina Baruchowo, within Włocławek County, Kuyavian-Pomeranian Voivodeship, in north-central Poland.
