= Kałęczynek =

- Village
- Location within Poland
- Coordinates: 52°44′13″N 18°50′52″E
- Country: Poland
- Voivodeship: Kuyavian-Pomeranian
- County: Włocławek
- Gmina: Lubanie
- Population: 110

Kałęczynek [kawɛnˈt͡ʂɨnɛk] is a village in the administrative district of Gmina Lubanie, within Włocławek County, Kuyavian-Pomeranian Voivodeship, in north-central Poland.
