= Nakonowo =

- Village
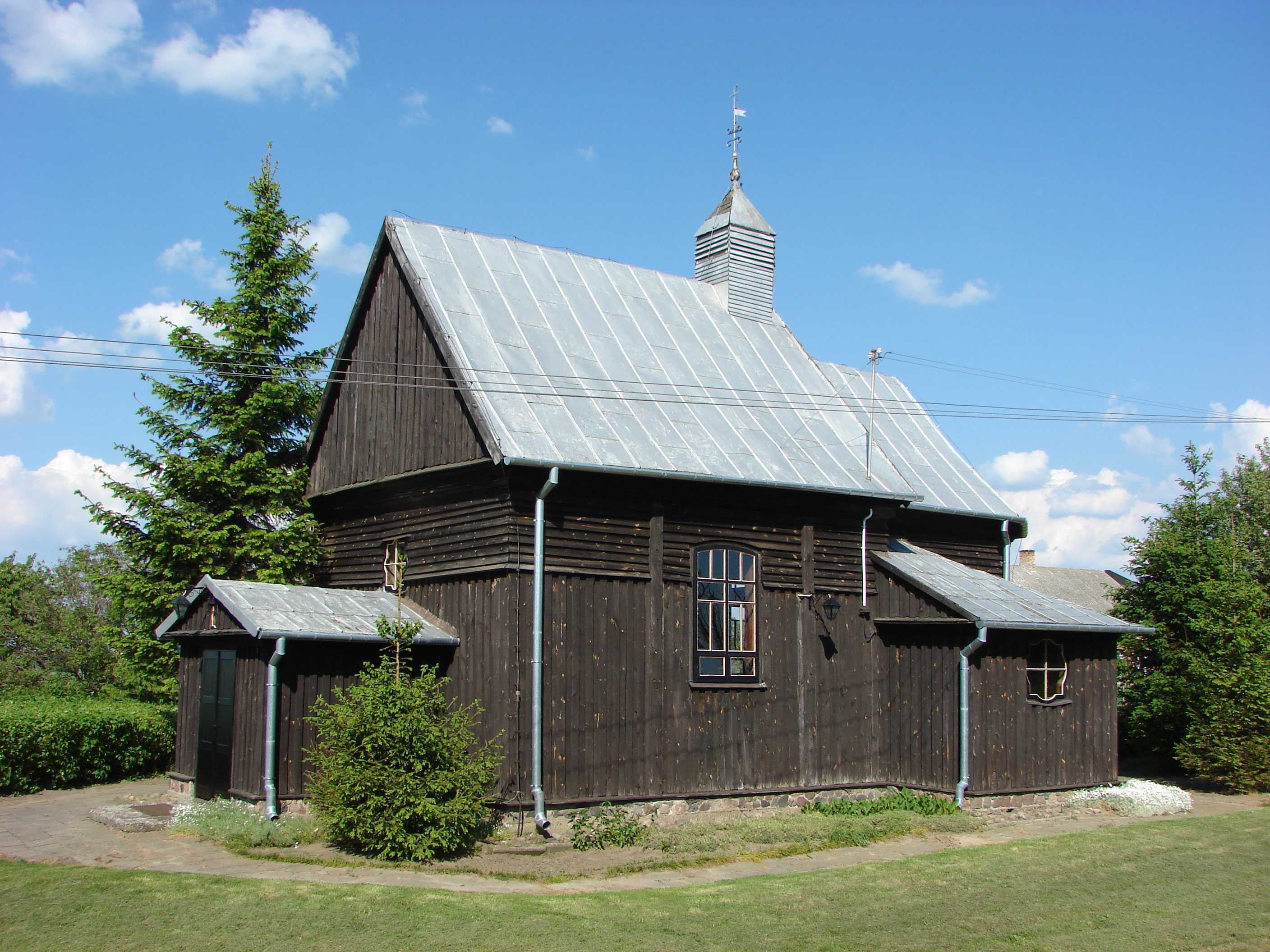
- Wooden church of Saint Mark called "Diabełek" what means ... Little Devil. Built 1765.

- Location within Poland
- Coordinates: 52°33′N 19°3′E
- Country: Poland
- Voivodeship: Kuyavian-Pomeranian
- County: Włocławek
- Gmina: Kowal

Nakonowo [nakɔˈnɔvɔ] is a village in the administrative district of Gmina Kowal, within Włocławek County, Kuyavian-Pomeranian Voivodeship, in north-central Poland.
