= Ustronie, Kuyavian-Pomeranian Voivodeship =

Ustronie
- Village
- Location within Poland
- Coordinates: 52°43′13″N 18°52′55″E
- Country: Poland
- Voivodeship: Kuyavian-Pomeranian
- County: Włocławek
- Gmina: Lubanie

Ustronie [usˈtrɔɲɛ] is a village in the administrative district of Gmina Lubanie, within Włocławek County, Kuyavian-Pomeranian Voivodeship, in north-central Poland.
