= Grabkowo =

- Village
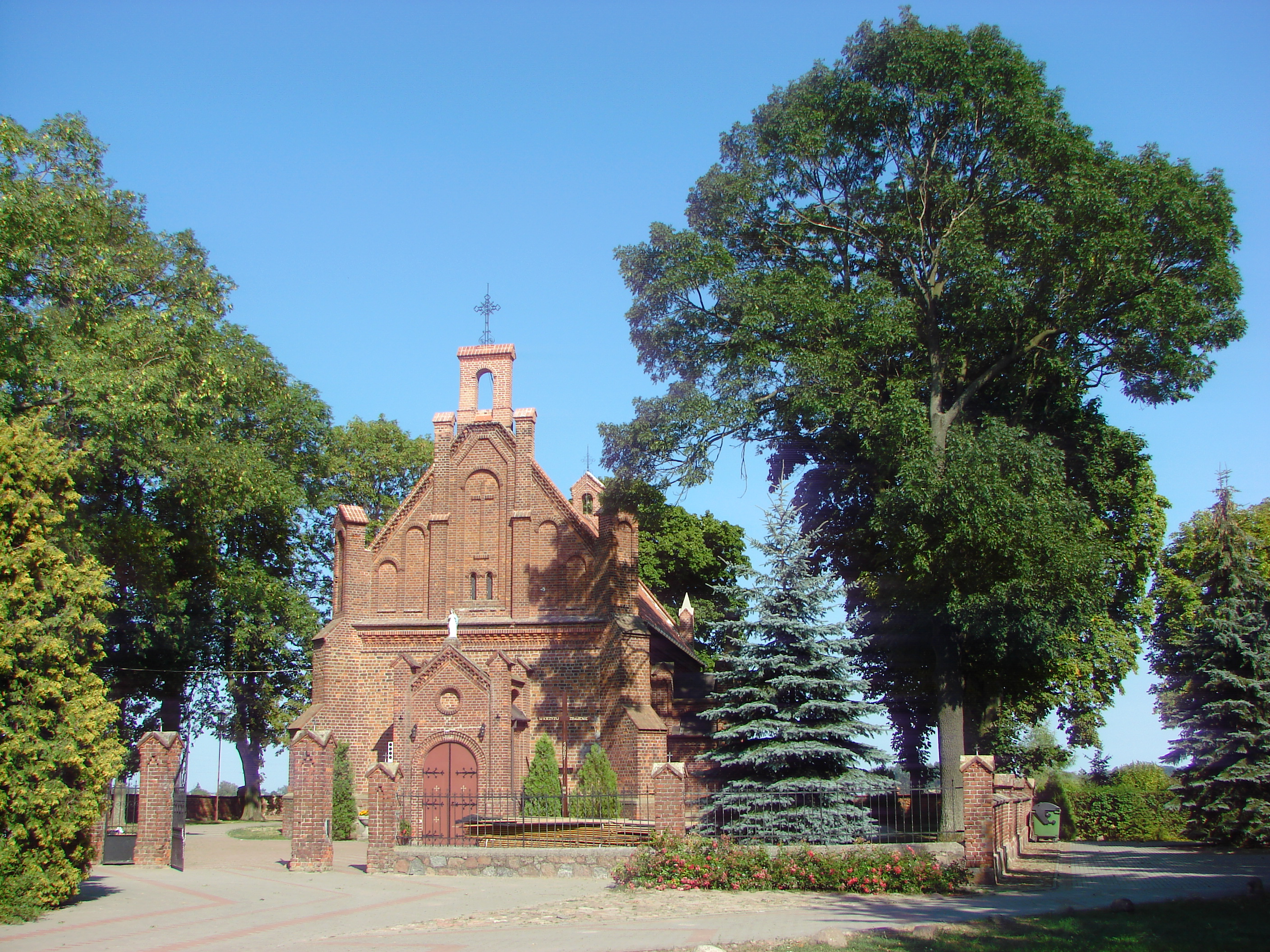
- Parish church of Saint Mary Magdalene from 1889.

- Location within Poland
- Coordinates: 52°30′N 19°7′E
- Country: Poland
- Voivodeship: Kuyavian-Pomeranian
- County: Włocławek
- Gmina: Kowal

Grabkowo [ɡrapˈkɔvɔ] is a village in the administrative district of Gmina Kowal, within Włocławek County, Kuyavian-Pomeranian Voivodeship, in north-central Poland.
