= Gąbinek =

- Village
- Location within Poland
- Coordinates: 52°44′N 18°58′E
- Country: Poland
- Voivodeship: Kuyavian-Pomeranian
- County: Włocławek
- Gmina: Lubanie
- Population: 220

Gąbinek [ɡɔmˈbinɛk] is a village in the administrative district of Gmina Lubanie, within Włocławek County, Kuyavian-Pomeranian Voivodeship, in north-central Poland.
