= Okna, Kuyavian-Pomeranian Voivodeship =

Okna
- Village
- Location within Poland
- Coordinates: 52°30′N 19°20′E
- Country: Poland
- Voivodeship: Kuyavian-Pomeranian
- County: Włocławek
- Gmina: Baruchowo

Okna [ˈɔkna] is a village in the administrative district of Gmina Baruchowo, within Włocławek County, Kuyavian-Pomeranian Voivodeship, in north-central Poland.
