= Kurowo-Kolonia, Kuyavian-Pomeranian Voivodeship =

Kurowo-Kolonia
- Village
- Location within Poland
- Coordinates: 52°28′01″N 19°15′05″E
- Country: Poland
- Voivodeship: Kuyavian-Pomeranian
- County: Włocławek
- Gmina: Baruchowo

Kurowo-Kolonia [kuˈrɔvɔ kɔˈlɔɲa] is a village in the administrative district of Gmina Baruchowo, within Włocławek County, Kuyavian-Pomeranian Voivodeship, in north-central Poland.
