= Gostynin and Włocławek Landscape Park =

Protected area in Poland

- Gostynińsko-Włocławski Park Krajobrazowy
- IUCN category V (protected landscape/seascape)

- Location within Poland
- Location: central Poland
- Coordinates: 52.54°N 19.347°E
- Area: 389.50 km^{2} (150.39 mi^{2})
- Established: 1979

Gostynin and Włocławek Landscape Park (Gostynińsko-Włocławski Park Krajobrazowy) is a protected area (Landscape Park) in north-central Poland, established in 1979, covering an area of 389.50 square kilometres (150.39 sq mi).

The Park is shared between two voivodeships: Kuyavian-Pomeranian Voivodeship and Masovian Voivodeship. Within Kuyavian-Pomeranian Voivodeship it lies in Włocławek County (Gmina Baruchowo, Gmina Kowal, Gmina Włocławek). Within Masovian Voivodeship it lies in Gostynin County (Gmina Gostynin) and Płock County (Gmina Łąck, Gmina Nowy Duninów), between the cities of Włocławek and Płock south of the Vistula.

Within the Landscape Park are 13 nature reserves.

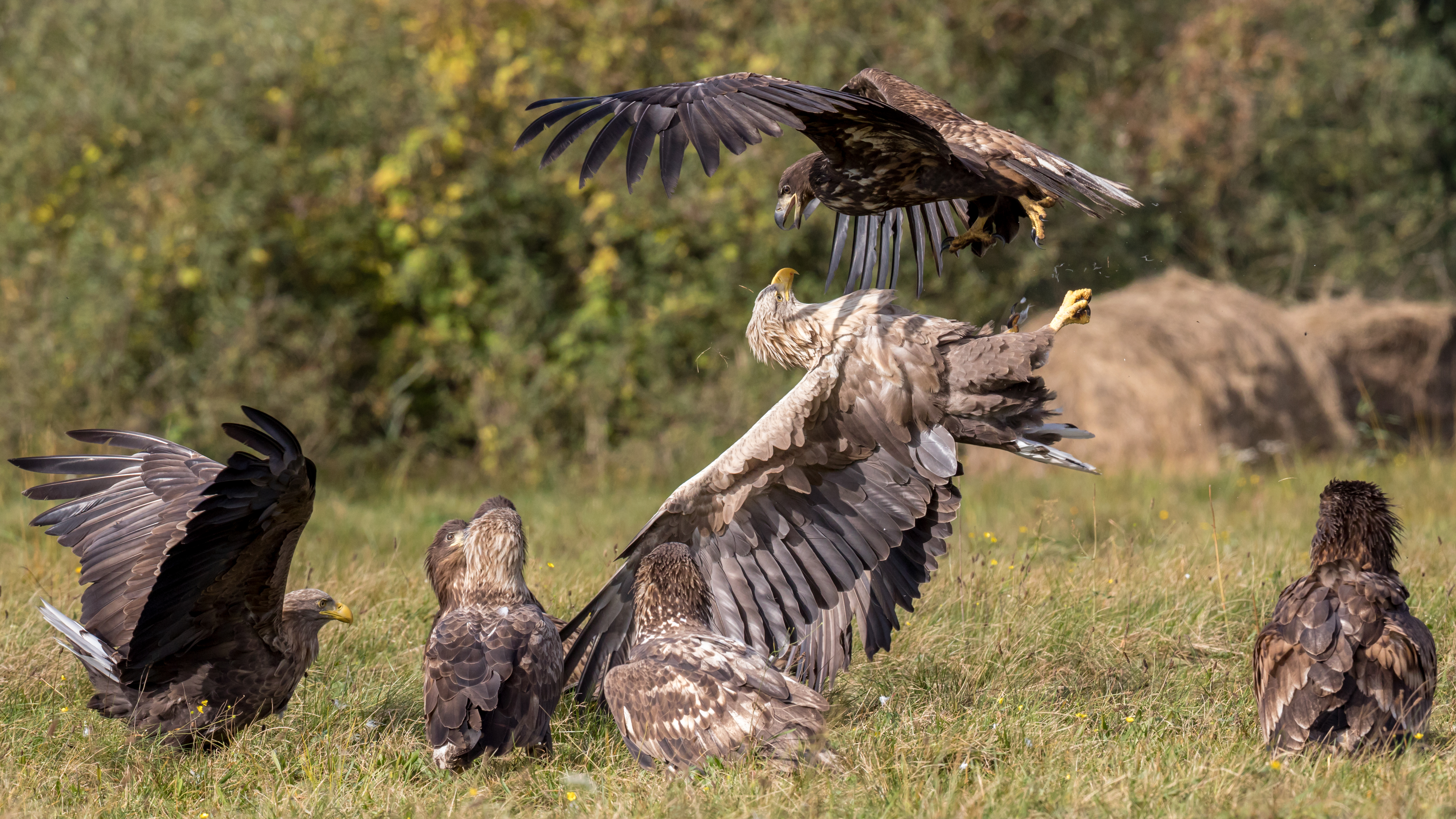
White-tailed eagle (Haliaeetus albicilla), Photo October 2017
