= Nowa Zawada =

- Village
- Location within Poland
- Coordinates: 52°27′N 19°17′E
- Country: Poland
- Voivodeship: Kuyavian-Pomeranian
- County: Włocławek
- Gmina: Baruchowo
- Population: 110

Nowa Zawada [ˈnɔva zaˈvada] is a village in the administrative district of Gmina Baruchowo, within Włocławek County, Kuyavian-Pomeranian Voivodeship, in north-central Poland.
