= Kocia Górka =

- Village
- Location within Poland
- Coordinates: 52°46′00″N 18°55′00″E
- Country: Poland
- Voivodeship: Kuyavian-Pomeranian
- County: Włocławek
- Gmina: Lubanie

Kocia Górka ([ˈkɔt͡ɕa ˈɡurka]; lit. Cat Hillock) is a village in the administrative district of Gmina Lubanie, within Włocławek County, Kuyavian-Pomeranian Voivodeship, in north-central Poland. Located in the Beskidy Mountains.
