= Zdzisław Skrzeczkowski =

Polish basketball player (1930–2024)

Personal information
- Born: 23 November 1930 Lubanie, Poland
- Died: 29 March 2024 (aged 93) Łódź Łódź

Career information
- Playing career: 1953–1962
- Position: Center

Career history
- 1953–1960: ŁKS Łódź
- 1960–1962: Społem Łódź

Zdzisław Skrzeczkowski (23 November 1930 – 29 March 2024) was a Polish basketball player.

== Biography ==
Born in Lubanie on 23 November 1930, Skrzeczkowski played for Legia Warsaw, ŁKS Łódź, and Społem Łódź. He played for the Polish national team during EuroBasket 1957, where he averaged 2.2 points per game.

Skrzeczkowski died in Łódź on 29 March 2024, at the age of 93.
