= Kucerz =

- Village
- Location within Poland
- Coordinates: 52°45′00″N 18°57′00″E
- Country: Poland
- Voivodeship: Kuyavian-Pomeranian
- County: Włocławek
- Gmina: Lubanie

Kucerz [ˈkut͡sɛʂ] is a village in the administrative district of Gmina Lubanie, in Włocławek County, Kuyavian-Pomeranian Voivodeship, in north-central Poland.
