= Kaźmierzewo, Włocławek County =

Kaźmierzewo
- Village
- Location within Poland
- Coordinates: 52°43′41″N 18°53′25″E
- Country: Poland
- Voivodeship: Kuyavian-Pomeranian
- County: Włocławek
- Gmina: Lubanie

Kaźmierzewo [kaʑmjɛˈʐɛvɔ] is a village in the administrative district of Gmina Lubanie, within Włocławek County, Kuyavian-Pomeranian Voivodeship, in north-central Poland.
