= Duninów Duży =

- Village
- Location within Poland
- Coordinates: 52°32′N 19°26′E
- Country: Poland
- Voivodeship: Masovian
- County: Płock
- Gmina: Nowy Duninów

Duninów Duży [duˈninuf ˈduʐɨ] is a village in the administrative district of Gmina Nowy Duninów, within Płock County, Masovian Voivodeship, in central Poland.
