= Gmina Lubanie =

Gmina Lubanie Lubanie Commune
- Gmina
- Flag Coat of arms
- Interactive map of Gmina Lubanie
- Coordinates (Lubanie): 52°44′53″N 18°55′11″E
- Country: Poland
- Voivodeship: Kuyavian-Pomeranian
- County: Włocławek County
- Seat: Lubanie

Area
  - Total: 69.3 km^{2} (26.8 sq mi)

Population (2006)
  - Total: 4,651
  - Density: 67.1/km^{2} (174/sq mi)
- Time zone: UTC+1 (CET)
  - Summer (DST): UTC+2 (CEST)
- Vehicle registration: CWL
- Website: http://www.lubanie.com

Gmina Lubanie is a rural gmina (administrative district) in Włocławek County, Kuyavian-Pomeranian Voivodeship, in central Poland. Its seat is the village of Lubanie, which lies approximately 14 kilometres (9 mi) north-west of Włocławek and 38 km (24 mi) south-east of Toruń.

The gmina covers an area of 69.3 square kilometres (26.8 sq mi), and as of 2006 its total population is 4,651.

== Villages ==
Gmina Lubanie contains the villages and settlements of Bodzia, Dąbrówka, Gąbinek, Janowice, Kałęczynek, Kaźmierzewo, Kocia Górka, Kolonia Ustrońska, Kucerz, Lubanie, Mikanowo A, Mikanowo B, Probostwo Dolne, Probostwo Górne, Przywieczerzyn, Przywieczerzynek, Sarnówka, Siutkówek, Tadzin, Ustronie, Włoszyca Lubańska, Zapomianowo and Zosin.

== Neighbouring gminas ==
Gmina Lubanie is bordered by the city of Włocławek and by the gminas of Bądkowo, Bobrowniki, Brześć Kujawski and Waganiec.
