= Baruchowo =

- Village
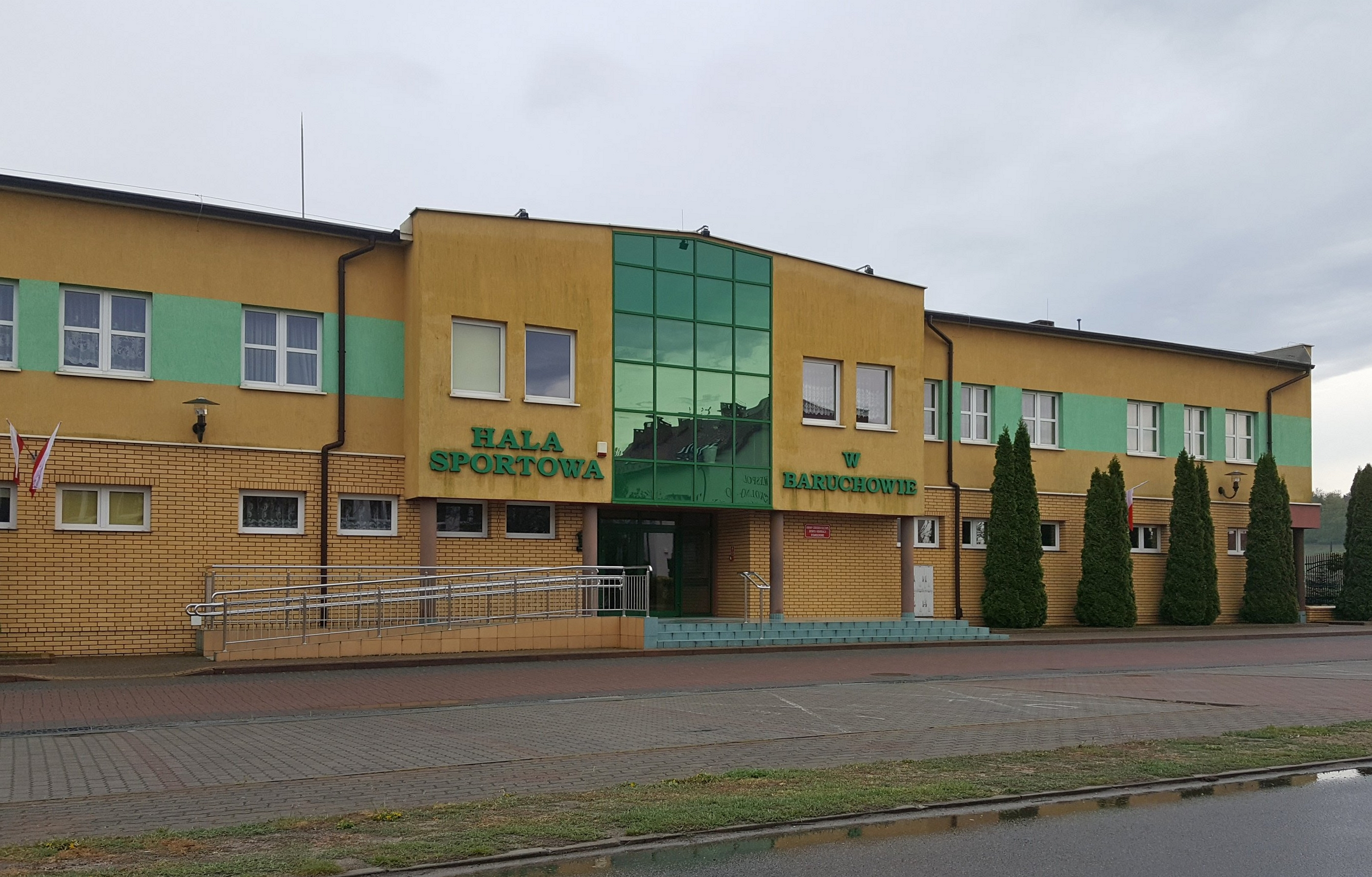
- Sports Hall in the Town

- Location within Poland
- Coordinates: 52°29′N 19°15′E
- Country: Poland
- Voivodeship: Kuyavian-Pomeranian
- County: Włocławek
- Gmina: Baruchowo

Baruchowo [baruˈxɔvɔ] is a village in Włocławek County, Kuyavian-Pomeranian Voivodeship, in north-central Poland. It is the seat of the gmina (administrative district) called Gmina Baruchowo.
