= Lipianki, Masovian Voivodeship =

Lipianki
- Village
- Location within Poland
- Coordinates: 52°31′48″N 19°22′49″E
- Country: Poland
- Voivodeship: Masovian
- County: Płock
- Gmina: Nowy Duninów
- Time zone: UTC+1 (CET)
  - Summer (DST): UTC+2 (CEST)

Lipianki [liˈpjanki] is a village in the administrative district of Gmina Nowy Duninów, within Płock County, Masovian Voivodeship, in central Poland.

There is an obelisk in Lipianki commemorating the residents deported to Germany in 1944 and those who were killed for helping partisans during World War II. The inscription on the monument says: "In tribute to the residents of the village of Lipianki, victims of repression by the regime of Nazi Germany, who were displaced and deported deep into the Reich for helping partisans from the surrounding forests in the autumn of 1944. In particular, in memory of those who paid for this help with the tribute of their own lives." The obelisk was unveiled in June 2012.
