= Matyldów, Płock County =

Matyldów
- Village
- Location within Poland
- Coordinates: 52°26′38″N 19°41′26″E
- Country: Poland
- Voivodeship: Masovian
- County: Płock
- Gmina: Łąck
- Time zone: UTC+1 (CET)
  - Summer (DST): UTC+2 (CEST)
- Vehicle registration: WPL

Matyldów [maˈtɨlduf] is a village in the administrative district of Gmina Łąck, within Płock County, Masovian Voivodeship, in central Poland.
