= Dominik Jędrzejewski =

Polish Roman Catholic priest and martyr

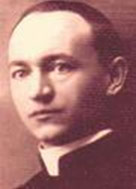
Dominik Jędrzejewski

Dominik Jędrzejewski (4 August 1886 – 29 August 1942) was a Polish Roman Catholic priest killed at the Dachau concentration camp during World War II. He was beatified in Warsaw on 13 June 1999.

Jędrzejewski was born in Kowal, Poland, and was the youngest of six children of Andrzej and Katarzyna Zakrzewski. He entered the seminary in Włocławek, was ordained a priest on 18 June 1911. He then served in parishes in Zadzim, Poczesna, and Kalisz, before starting work as a teacher of religion in schools in 1920; he taught for 5 years before moving to parish work in Kokanin and Gosławice. He also served as a prison chaplain, as a high school prefect, and also was devoted to youth work.

After the outbreak of World War II, Jędrzejewski was arrested on 26 August 1940 and was taken to a transit camp in Szczeglin and then to Sachsenhausen concentration camp. On 14 December 1940 he was sent to Dachau. He refused to renounce the priesthood to regain freedom and died from debilitating work on 29 August 1942.

Jędrzejewski was beatified by Pope John Paul II in Warsaw 13 June 1999 as part of a group of 108 Martyrs of World War II.
