= Sarnówka, Kuyavian-Pomeranian Voivodeship =

Sarnówka
- Village
- Location within Poland
- Coordinates: 52°43′N 18°51′E
- Country: Poland
- Voivodeship: Kuyavian-Pomeranian
- County: Włocławek
- Gmina: Lubanie

Sarnówka [sarˈnufka] is a village in the administrative district of Gmina Lubanie, within Włocławek County, Kuyavian-Pomeranian Voivodeship, in north-central Poland.
