= Gmina Baruchowo =

Gmina Baruchowo Baruchowo Commune
- Gmina
- Coat of arms
- Interactive map of Gmina Baruchowo
- Coordinates (Baruchowo): 52°29′N 19°15′E
- Country: Poland
- Voivodeship: Kuyavian-Pomeranian
- County: Włocławek County
- Seat: Baruchowo

Area
  - Total: 107.05 km^{2} (41.33 sq mi)

Population (2006)
  - Total: 3,644
  - Density: 34.04/km^{2} (88.16/sq mi)
- Time zone: UTC+1 (CET)
  - Summer (DST): UTC+2 (CEST)
- Vehicle registration: CWL
- Website: http://www.baruchowo.pl/

Gmina Baruchowo is a rural gmina (administrative district) in Włocławek County, Kuyavian-Pomeranian Voivodeship, in central Poland. Its seat is the village of Baruchowo, which lies approximately 23 kilometres (14 mi) south-east of Włocławek and 75 km (47 mi) south-east of Toruń.

The gmina covers an area of 107.05 square kilometres (41.3 sq mi), and as of 2006 its total population is 3,644.

The gmina contains part of the protected area called Gostynin-Włocławek Landscape Park.

== Villages ==
Gmina Baruchowo contains the villages and settlements of Baruchowo, Goreń Duży, Grodno, Kłótno, Kurowo-Kolonia, Kurowo-Parcele, Lubaty, Nowa Zawada, Okna, Patrówek, Skrzynki, Świątkowice, Zakrzewo and Zawada-Piaski.

== Neighbouring gminas ==
Gmina Baruchowo is bordered by the gminas of Gostynin, Kowal, Lubień Kujawski, Nowy Duninów and Włocławek.
