= Nowe Rumunki =

- Village
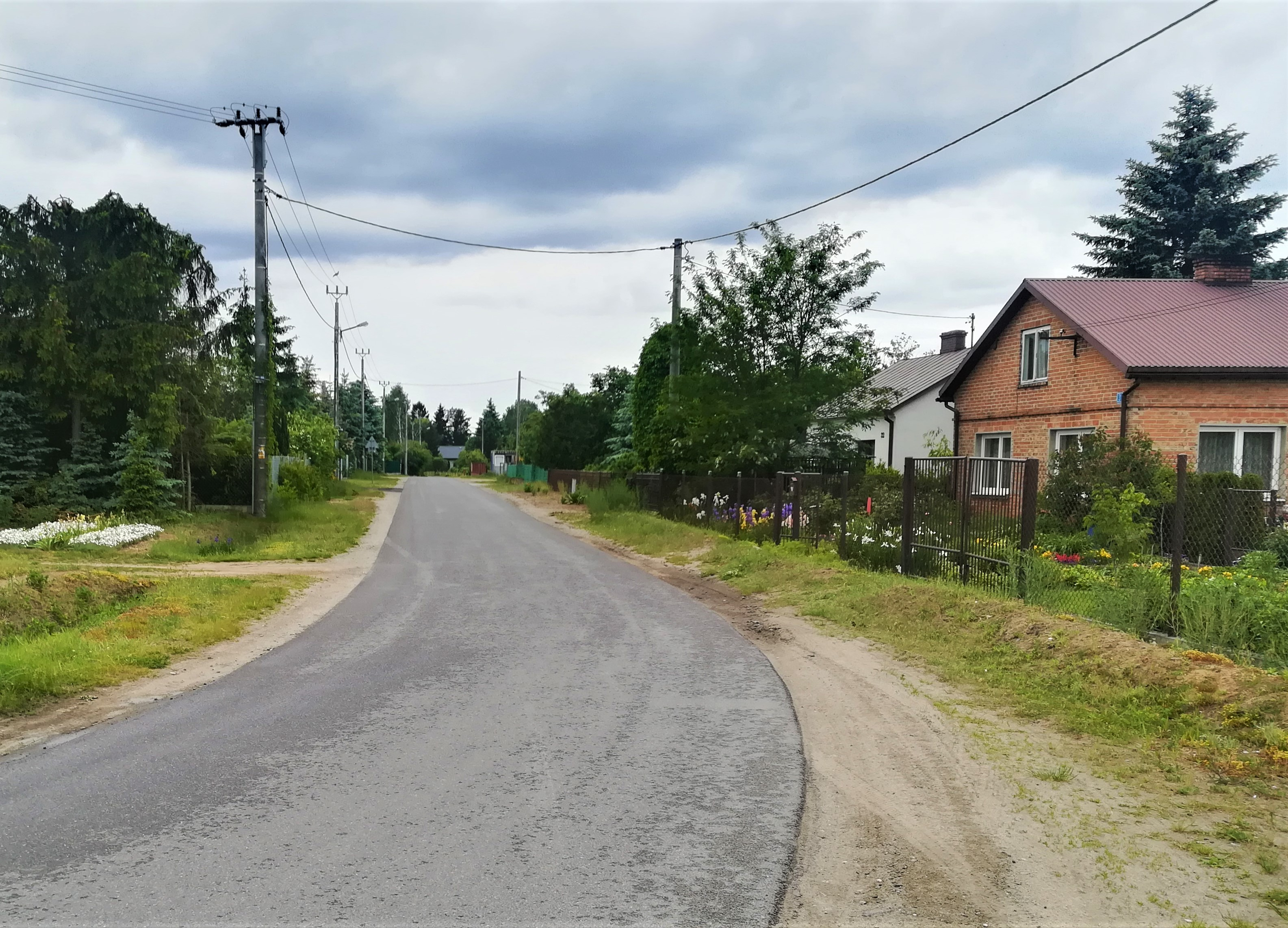

- Location within Poland
- Coordinates: 52°28′10″N 19°39′39″E
- Country: Poland
- Voivodeship: Masovian
- County: Płock
- Gmina: Łąck
- Time zone: UTC+1 (CET)
  - Summer (DST): UTC+2 (CEST)
- Vehicle registration: WPL

Nowe Rumunki ([ˈnɔvɛ ruˈmuŋki]) is a village in the administrative district of Gmina Łąck, within Płock County, Masovian Voivodeship, in central Poland.
