= Wola Łącka =

- Village
- Location within Poland
- Coordinates: 52°27′N 19°35′E
- Country: Poland
- Voivodeship: Masovian
- County: Płock
- Gmina: Łąck
- Time zone: UTC+1 (CET)
  - Summer (DST): UTC+2 (CEST)
- Vehicle registration: WPL

Wola Łącka [ˈvɔla ˈwɔnt͡ska] is a village in the administrative district of Gmina Łąck, within Płock County, Masovian Voivodeship, in central Poland.

== History ==
In the late 19th century, the village had a population of 135. According to the 1921 census, the village with the adjacent manor farm had a population of 134, 97.1% Polish.

During the German occupation (World War II), on December 1, 1939, the Germans carried out a massacre of 22 Poles from the nearby town of Gostynin in the local forest, as part of the Intelligenzaktion. Among the victims were mayor Michał Jarmoliński, member of Polish parliament Andrzej Czapski, chiefs of the town's police and fire department, teachers and priests.
