= Wincentów =

Wincentów may refer to the following places:

- Wincentów, Krasnystaw County in Lublin Voivodeship (east Poland)
- Wincentów, Lubartów County in Lublin Voivodeship (east Poland)
- Wincentów, Bełchatów County in Łódź Voivodeship (central Poland)
- Wincentów, Łask County in Łódź Voivodeship (central Poland)
- Wincentów, Kielce County in Świętokrzyskie Voivodeship (south-central Poland)
- Wincentów, Końskie County in Świętokrzyskie Voivodeship (south-central Poland)
- Wincentów, Włoszczowa County in Świętokrzyskie Voivodeship (south-central Poland)
- Wincentów, Lipsko County in Masovian Voivodeship (east-central Poland)
- Wincentów, Piaseczno County in Masovian Voivodeship (east-central Poland)
- Wincentów, Płock County in Masovian Voivodeship (central Poland)
- Wincentów, Radom County in Masovian Voivodeship (east-central Poland)
- Wincentów, Zwoleń County in Masovian Voivodeship (east-central Poland)
- Wincentów, Żyrardów County in Masovian Voivodeship (east-central Poland)
- Wincentów, Greater Poland Voivodeship (central Poland)
