= Zdwórz Lake =

- Jezioro Zdworskie (Polish)
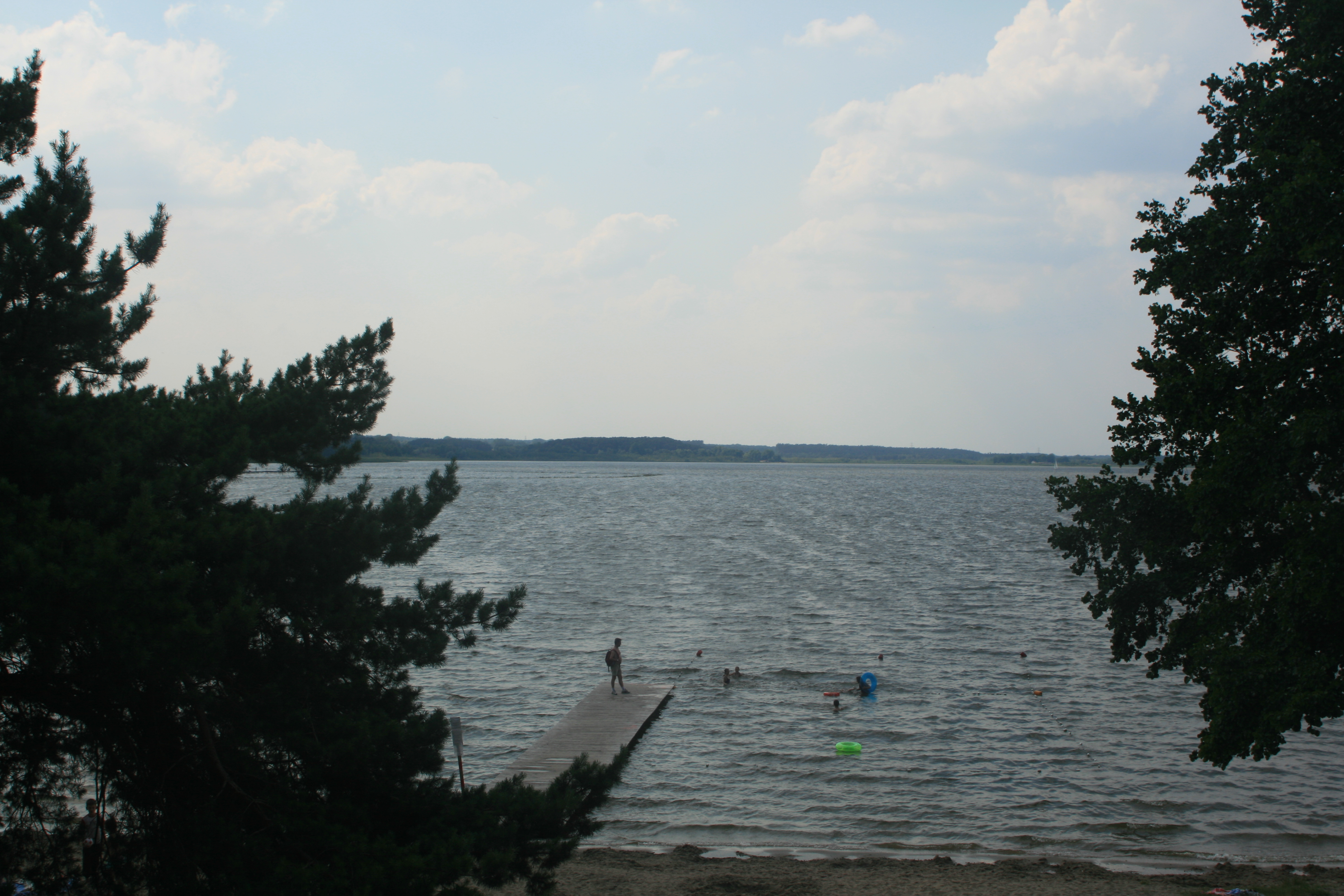

- Location within Poland
- Location: Masovian Voivodeship, Poland
- Coordinates: 52°26′8″N 19°41′14″E
- Type: Artificial lake
- Max. length: 3.3 km (2.1 mi)
- Max. width: 1.3 km (0.81 mi)
- Surface area: 328 ha (810 acres)
- Average depth: 2.3 m (7 ft 7 in)
- Max. depth: 5.4 m (18 ft)
- Surface elevation: 79 m (259 ft)

Zdwórz Lake (Polish pronunciation: [ˈzdvuʂ]; Polish: Jezioro Zdworskie) is an artificial lake in the Masovian Voivodeship, Poland. It is undergoing ecological restoration due to eutrophication (excessive plant growth). It is named after the nearby village of Zdwórz.
