= Max Kowalski =

Composer and singer (1882–1956)

Max Kowalski (Kowal 10 August 1882 – London 4 June 1956) was a composer, singer and singing teacher.

Kowalski was born in Kowal, Poland. He moved with his family to Germany in 1883, a year after he was born. He studied law in Marburg, obtaining a doctorate and worked as a lawyer in Frankfurt am Main. There he studied singing as well as composition with Bernhard Sekles and published his first work, a musical version of Albert Giraud's Pierrot Lunaire (independently from Arnold Schoenberg's work of the same year), in 1912-13. He continued to compose and published until 1934, writing a large number of Lieder which were widely performed in Germany.

In 1938, he was forced to give up his law practice. His wife, Anna, had been imprisoned three times from 1937 first in Preungesheim prison then in KZs Moringen, Lichtenburg und Ravensbrück. Anna committed suicide on 25 October 1938 although she had exit papers and immigration papers for Britain. From 11 to 27 November 1938 Max Kowalski was imprisoned in the Buchenwald concentration camp as part of an effort to force Jews to emigrate so their property could be confiscated.

Kowalski emigrated with his daughter to London, where he first worked as a piano tuner and synagogal cantor. Later he established himself as a singing teacher. He continued to compose, but none of his later songs was published. He died in 1956 in London.

== Recordings ==
- Lieder by Max Kowalski, Wolfgang Holzmair, Thérèse Lindquist. Bridge Records, New Rochelle, New York 2015
- Songs of Max Kowalski, Simon Wallfisch, Camille Butcher, Edward Rushton 2023 Nimbus Records

== Literature ==
- Baker's Biographical Dictionary of Musicians, (Nicolas Slonimsky, Editor) New York: G. Schirmer, 1958
