= Łąck =

- Village
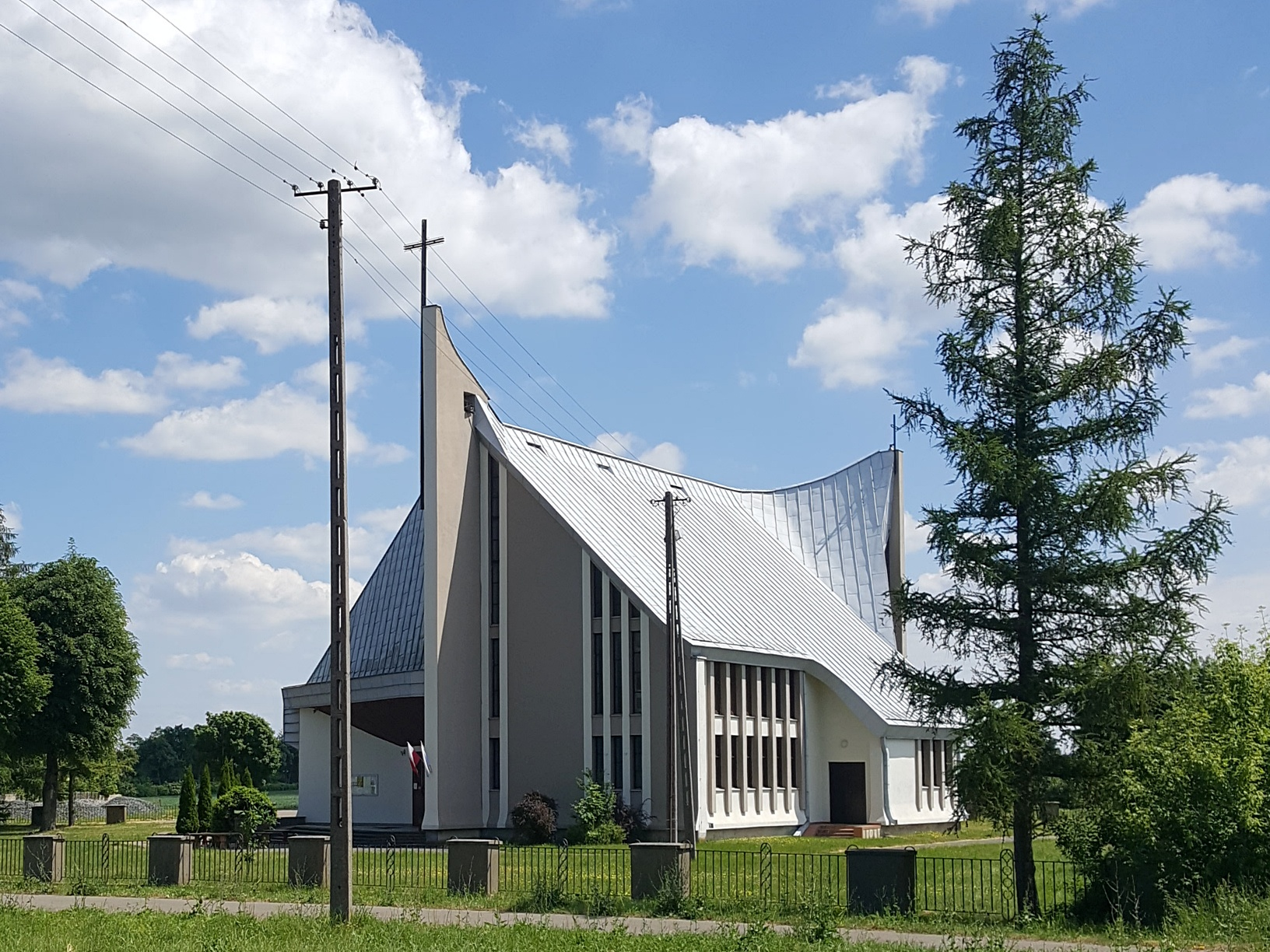
- Church of Our Lady of Częstochowa in Łąck

- Flag Coat of arms

- Location within Poland
- Coordinates: 52°28′N 19°37′E
- Country: Poland
- Voivodeship: Masovian
- County: Płock
- Gmina: Łąck

Population
  - Total: 1,350
- Time zone: UTC+1 (CET)
  - Summer (DST): UTC+2 (CEST)
- Vehicle registration: WPL

Łąck [wɔnt͡sk] is a village in Płock County, Masovian Voivodeship, in central Poland. It is the seat of the gmina (administrative district) called Gmina Łąck. It is located on the western shore of Łąckie Duże Lake.

The landmark of Łąck is the local palace.

Various Polish films were shot in the village, including Satan from the Seventh Grade, At Full Gallop, With Fire and Sword, as well as the 1960s TV series Stawka większa niż życie.

== History ==
In the late 19th century, there was a distillery, a brick factory and a cheese factory in Łąck, and the village had a population of 308. According to the 1921 census, the village with the adjacent manor farm had a population of 312, entirely Polish by nationality and 99.0% Roman Catholic by confession.

During the German occupation of Poland (World War II), the forest of Łąck was the site of large massacres, in which over 200 Poles were murdered as part of the Intelligenzaktion. Around 200 Poles, previously imprisoned in Płock, among them teachers, activists, shopowners, notaries, local officials, pharmacists, directors and members of the Polish Military Organisation, were murdered in Łąck between October 1939 and February 1940, and another 10 Poles were murdered in March 1940. In Łąck, Germans established a transit camp for Poles expelled from nearby villages to the so-called General Government or deported as forced labour to Germany, and many Polish families from Łąck were expelled in May 1942. In the winter of 1942–1943, the Germans buried about 300 kidnapped Polish children in the local forests, after the children were deported in a freight train from another region of occupied Poland to Płock and froze to death. In 1943–1945 the German administration used the Germanized name Lonsch in reference to the village. German occupation ended in 1945.
