= Gmina Łąck =

Gmina Łąck Łąck Commune
- Gmina
- Flag Coat of arms
- Interactive map of Gmina Łąck
- Coordinates (Łąck): 52°28′N 19°37′E
- Country: Poland
- Voivodeship: Masovian
- County: Płock County
- Seat: Łąck

Area
  - Total: 93.74 km^{2} (36.19 sq mi)

Population (2006)
  - Total: 4,932
  - Density: 52.61/km^{2} (136.3/sq mi)
- Time zone: UTC+1 (CET)
  - Summer (DST): UTC+2 (CEST)
- Vehicle registration: WPL

Gmina Łąck is a rural gmina (administrative district) in Płock County, Masovian Voivodeship, in central Poland. Its seat is the village of Łąck, which lies approximately 11 kilometres (7 mi) south-west of Płock and 99 km (62 mi) west of Warsaw.

The gmina covers an area of 93.74 square kilometres (36.2 sq mi), and as of 2006 its total population is 4,932.

The gmina contains part of the protected area called Gostynin-Włocławek Landscape Park.

== Villages ==
Gmina Łąck contains the villages and settlements of Antoninów, Grabina, Korzeń Królewski, Korzeń Rządowy, Kościuszków, Koszelówka, Łąck, Ludwików, Matyldów, Nowe Rumunki, Podlasie, Sędeń Duży, Sędeń Mały, Wincentów, Władysławów, Wola Łącka, Zaździerz, Zdwórz and Zofiówka.

== Neighbouring gminas ==
Gmina Łąck is bordered by the city of Płock and by the gminas of Gąbin, Gostynin, Nowy Duninów and Szczawin Kościelny.
