= Brwilno, Gmina Nowy Duninów =

Brwilno
- Village
- Location within Poland
- Coordinates: 52°33′16″N 19°35′09″E
- Country: Poland
- Voivodeship: Masovian
- County: Płock
- Gmina: Nowy Duninów

Brwilno [ˈbrvilnɔ] is a village in the administrative district of Gmina Nowy Duninów, within Płock County, Masovian Voivodeship, in east-central Poland.
