= Włoszyca Lubańska =

- Village
- Location within Poland
- Coordinates: 52°46′29″N 18°55′11″E
- Country: Poland
- Voivodeship: Kuyavian-Pomeranian
- County: Włocławek
- Gmina: Lubanie
- Population: 280

Włoszyca Lubańska [vwɔˈʂɨt͡sa luˈbaɲska] is a village in the administrative district of Gmina Lubanie, within Włocławek County, Kuyavian-Pomeranian Voivodeship, in north-central Poland.
