= Kamion, Płock County =

Kamion
- Village
- Location within Poland
- Coordinates: 52°35′N 19°26′E
- Country: Poland
- Voivodeship: Masovian
- County: Płock
- Gmina: Nowy Duninów
- Time zone: UTC+1 (CET)
  - Summer (DST): UTC+2 (CEST)
- Vehicle registration: WPL

Kamion [ˈkamjɔn] is a village in the administrative district of Gmina Nowy Duninów, within Płock County, Masovian Voivodeship, in central Poland.
