= Korzeń Królewski =

- Village
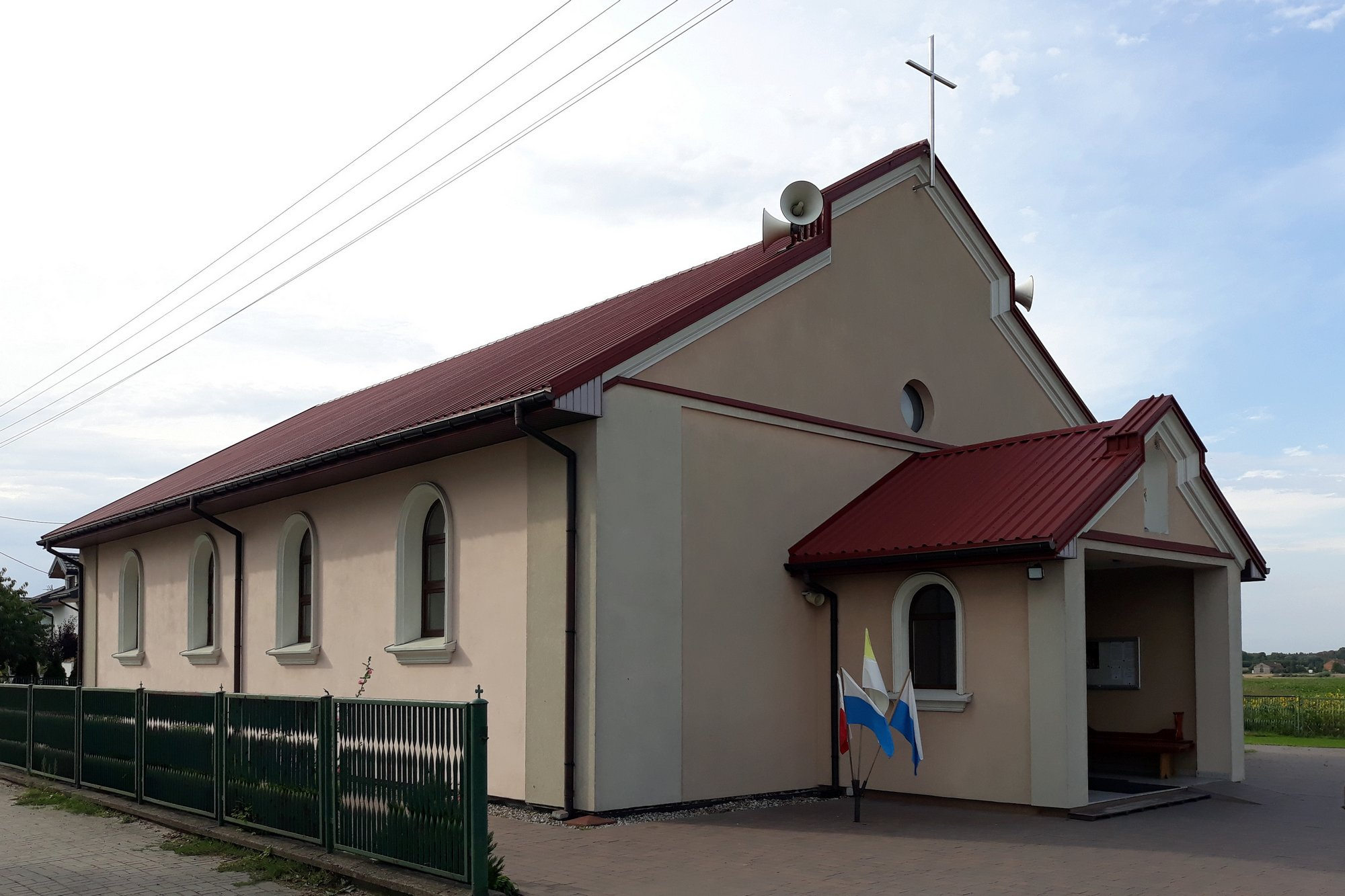
- Our Lady of the Rosary church in Korzeń Królewski

- Location within Poland
- Coordinates: 52°26′N 19°37′E
- Country: Poland
- Voivodeship: Masovian
- County: Płock
- Gmina: Łąck
- Time zone: UTC+1 (CET)
  - Summer (DST): UTC+2 (CEST)
- Vehicle registration: WPL

Korzeń Królewski (Polish pronunciation: [ˈkɔʐɛj̃ kruˈlɛfskʲi]) is a village in the administrative district of Gmina Łąck, within Płock County, Masovian Voivodeship, in central Poland.
