= Sędeń Duży =

- Village
- Location within Poland
- Coordinates: 52°29′56″N 19°34′11″E
- Country: Poland
- Voivodeship: Masovian
- County: Płock
- Gmina: Łąck

Population
  - Total: 320
- Time zone: UTC+1 (CET)
  - Summer (DST): UTC+2 (CEST)
- Vehicle registration: WPL

Sędeń Duży [ˈsɛndɛɲ ˈduʐɨ] is a village in the administrative district of Gmina Łąck, within Płock County, Masovian Voivodeship, in central Poland.
