= Gmina Nowy Duninów =

Gmina Nowy Duninów Nowy Duninów Commune
- Gmina
- Coat of arms
- Interactive map of Gmina Nowy Duninów
- Coordinates (Nowy Duninów): 52°34′49″N 19°28′24″E
- Country: Poland
- Voivodeship: Masovian
- County: Płock County
- Seat: Nowy Duninów

Area
  - Total: 144.79 km^{2} (55.90 sq mi)

Population (2006)
  - Total: 3,884
  - Density: 26.83/km^{2} (69.48/sq mi)
- Time zone: UTC+1 (CET)
  - Summer (DST): UTC+2 (CEST)
- Vehicle registration: WPL
- Website: http://nowyduninow.info.pl

Gmina Nowy Duninów is a rural gmina (administrative district) in Płock County, Masovian Voivodeship, in central Poland. Its seat is the village of Nowy Duninów, which lies approximately 16 kilometres (10 mi) west of Płock and 112 km (70 mi) west of Warsaw.

The gmina covers an area of 144.79 square kilometres (55.9 sq mi), and as of 2006 its total population is 3,884.

The gmina contains part of the protected area called Gostynin-Włocławek Landscape Park.

== History ==
Archaeological excavations indicate that the gmina of Nowy Duninów was inhabited in the Neolithic by early agriculturalists, as well as hunters and fishermen. The name of Duninów most likely comes from the Dunin family who ruled in the area in the 12th Century, most notably Piotr Włost Dunin.

An early significant historical event was the creation at Duninów of a pontoon bridge across the Vistula for the troops of Władysław II Jagiełło in 1414. The troops were returning from the Hunger War, an expedition against the Teutonic Knights.

== Villages ==
Gmina Nowy Duninów contains the villages and settlements of Brwilno, Brwilno Dolne, Brzezinna Góra, Duninów Duży, Dzierzązna, Grodziska, Jeżewo, Kamion, Karolewo, Lipianki, Nowa Wieś, Nowy Duninów, Popłacin, Soczewka, Środoń, Stary Duninów, Trzcianno and Wola Brwileńska.

== Neighbouring gminas ==
Gmina Nowy Duninów is bordered by the city of Płock and by the gminas of Baruchowo, Brudzeń Duży, Gostynin, Łąck, Stara Biała and Włocławek.

== Notes and references ==
- Polish official population figures 2006
