= Grabina, Płock County =

Grabina
- Village
- Location within Poland
- Coordinates: 52°28′48″N 19°40′5″E
- Country: Poland
- Voivodeship: Masovian
- County: Płock
- Gmina: Łąck
- Time zone: UTC+1 (CET)
  - Summer (DST): UTC+2 (CEST)
- Vehicle registration: WPL

Grabina [ɡraˈbina] is a village in the administrative district of Gmina Łąck, within Płock County, Masovian Voivodeship, in central Poland.
