= Kowal (town) =

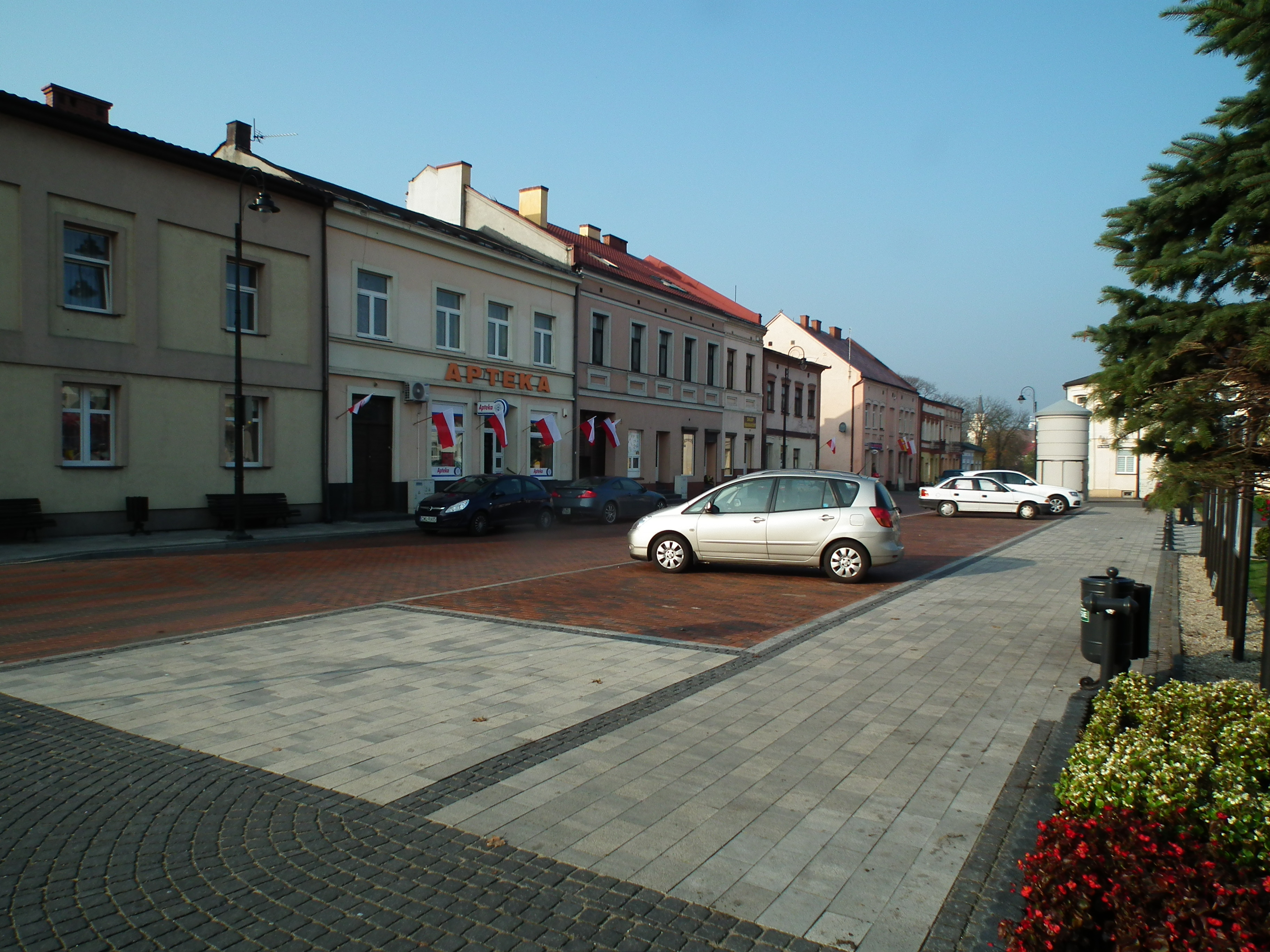
- Market Square in Kowal

- Flag Coat of arms

- Location within Poland
- Coordinates: 52°31′57″N 19°8′42″E
- Country: Poland
- Voivodeship: Kuyavian-Pomeranian
- County: Włocławek
- Gmina: Kowal (urban gmina)

Area
  - Total: 4.68 km^{2} (1.81 sq mi)

Population (2010)
  - Total: 3,488
  - Density: 745/km^{2} (1,930/sq mi)
- Time zone: UTC+1 (CET)
  - Summer (DST): UTC+2 (CEST)
- Postal code: 87-820
- Vehicle registration: CWL
- Website: http://www.kowal.eu/

Kowal [ˈkɔval] is a town in Włocławek County, Kuyavian-Pomeranian Voivodeship, in central Poland, with 3,478 inhabitants (2004).

== History ==
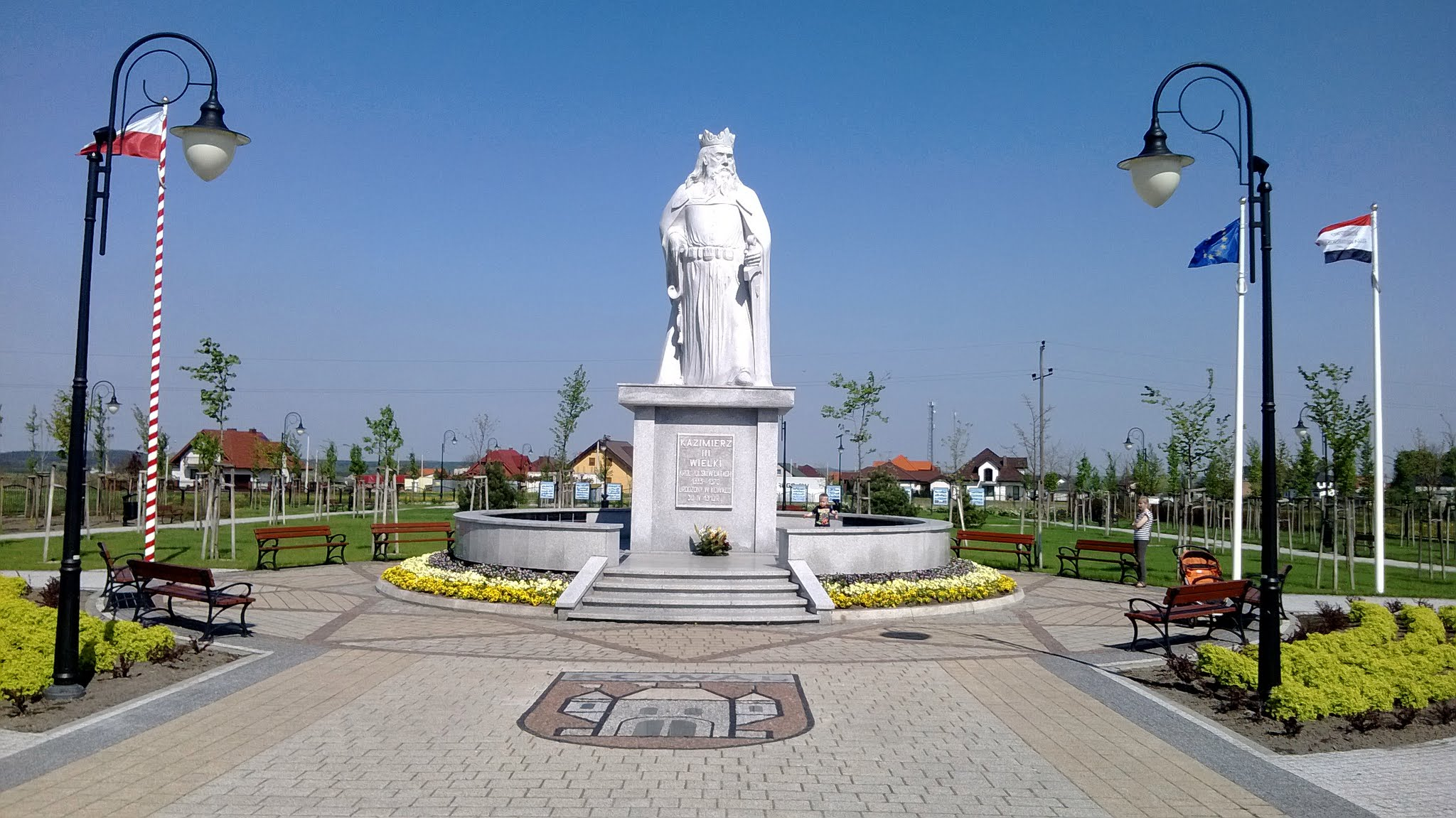
King Casimir III the Great Monument

Kowal was the birthplace of Casimir III the Great, the last Polish King from the Piast dynasty. It was a county seat and royal town of the Kingdom of Poland, administratively located in the Brześć Kujawski Voivodeship in the Greater Poland Province.

During the German occupation of Poland (World War II), Kowal was one of the sites of executions of Poles, carried out by the Germans in 1939 as part of the Intelligenzaktion. In 1940, the German gendarmerie carried out expulsions of Poles, who were deported to a transit camp in Łódź and then to the General Government in the more-eastern part of German-occupied Poland, while their houses, shops and workshops were handed over to German colonists as part of the Lebensraum policy.

== Demography ==
Historical population

Year	Pop.	±%
1897	3,993	—
1921	4,063	+1.8%
1931	4,482	+10.3%

Year	Pop.	±%
1950	3,031	−32.4%
1960	2,983	−1.6%
2010	3,488	+16.9%

== Transport ==
The town is located on Poland's most important north–south highway, National Road 1 (DK1). The town bypass for this road was opened in December, 2007, allowing heavy traffic to avoid the town center. The A1 motorway passes just to the southeast of the town.

== Sports ==
Its local association football team is Kujawiak Kowal.

== Notable people ==
The town is the birthplace of

- Casimir III, (1310–1370), King of Poland, 1333 to 1370.
- Max Kowalski (1882—1956) a German composer, singer and singing teacher.
- Dominik Jędrzejewski (1886–1942) martyred Roman Catholic priest
- Jan Nowicki (1939-2022) Polish actor, famous for his role as János in Márta Mészarós "Diaries" trilogy movies
