= Lubanie =

- Village
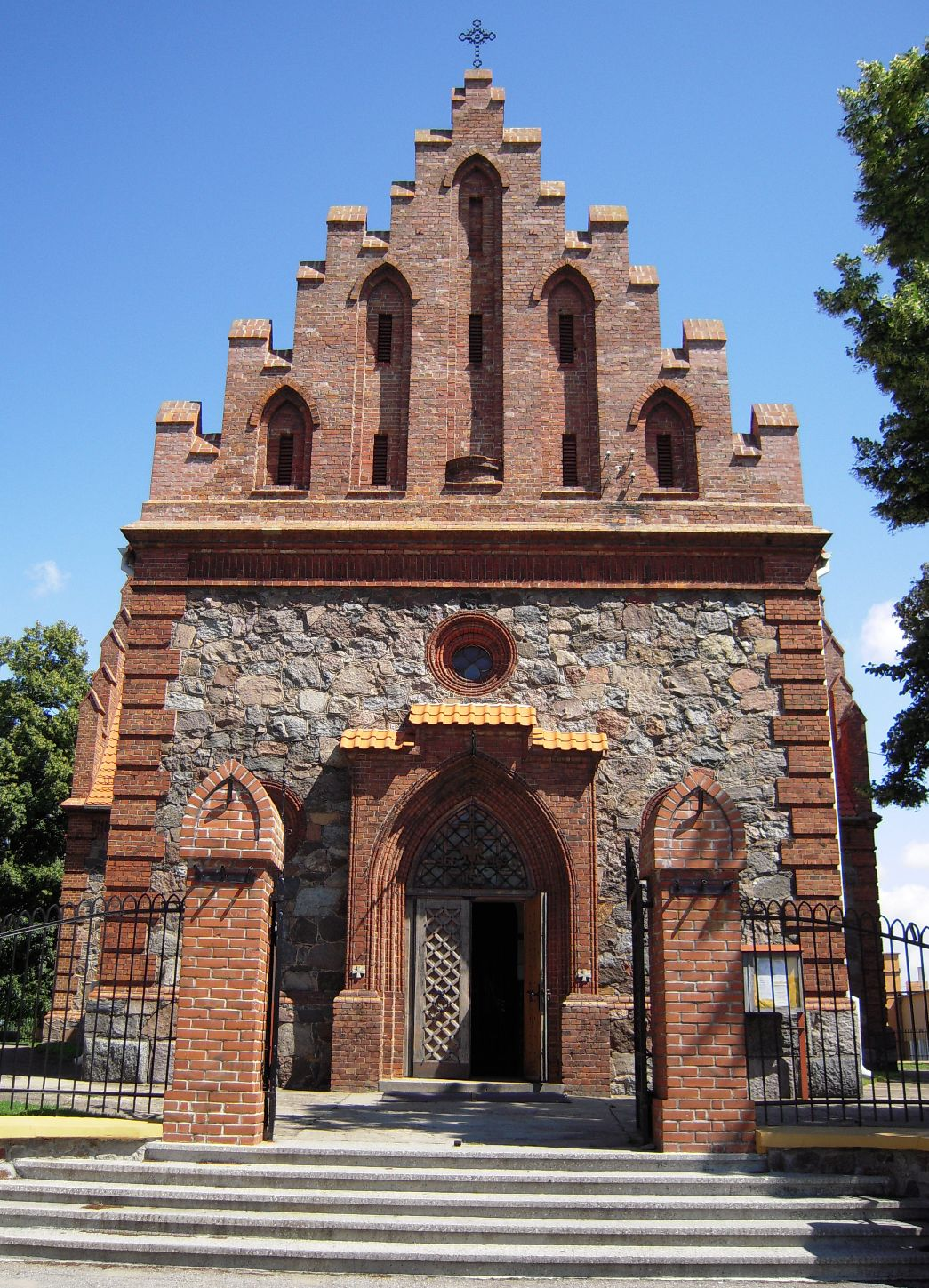
- Saint Nicholas church in Lubanie

- Location within Poland
- Coordinates: 52°44′53″N 18°55′11″E
- Country: Poland
- Voivodeship: Kuyavian-Pomeranian
- County: Włocławek
- Gmina: Lubanie
- Population: 810
- Time zone: UTC+1 (CET)
  - Summer (DST): UTC+2 (CEST)
- Vehicle registration: CWL

Lubanie [luˈbaɲɛ] is a village in Włocławek County, Kuyavian-Pomeranian Voivodeship, in north-central Poland. It is the seat of the gmina (administrative district) called Gmina Lubanie. It is located in the region of Kuyavia.

== History ==
During the German occupation of Poland (World War II), in 1939–1940, the occupiers expelled the entire population of Lubanie. Houses and farms of expelled Poles were handed over to German colonists as part of the Lebensraum policy. The Poles were either deported to the General Government in the more eastern part of German-occupied Poland or enslaved as forced labour of German colonists in the area. A newborn child of one of the families died during the deportation.

== Transport ==
There is a train station in Lubanie. The A1 motorway and National road 91 run nearby, west of the village.
