= Stary Duninów =

- Village
- Location within Poland
- Coordinates: 52°34′27″N 19°30′39″E
- Country: Poland
- Voivodeship: Masovian
- County: Płock
- Gmina: Nowy Duninów
- Time zone: UTC+1 (CET)
  - Summer (DST): UTC+2 (CEST)
- Vehicle registration: WPL

Stary Duninów [ˈstarɨ duˈninuf] is a village in the administrative district of Gmina Nowy Duninów, within Płock County, Masovian Voivodeship, in central Poland.
