= Lubanski (surname) =

Lubański (masculine) or Lubańska (feminine) is a Polish surname that may refer to

- Chris Lubanski (born 1985), American baseball player
- Eddie Lubanski (1929–2010), American bowler
- Józef Lubański (1915–1947), Polish physicist
  - Pauli–Lubanski pseudovector
- Włodzimierz Lubański (born 1947), Polish football striker
