= Winsen =

Winsen can refer to:

- Winsen (Luhe) (also: Winsen an der Luhe), capital of the district Harburg, Lower Saxony, Germany
- Winsen an der Aller, a municipality in the district of Celle, Lower Saxony, Germany
- Winsen, Schleswig-Holstein, a municipality in the district of Segeberg, Schleswig-Holstein, Germany

== See also ==
- Winssen, a village in Gelderland, Netherlands
