= Włocławek County =

Włocławek County Powiat włocławski
- County
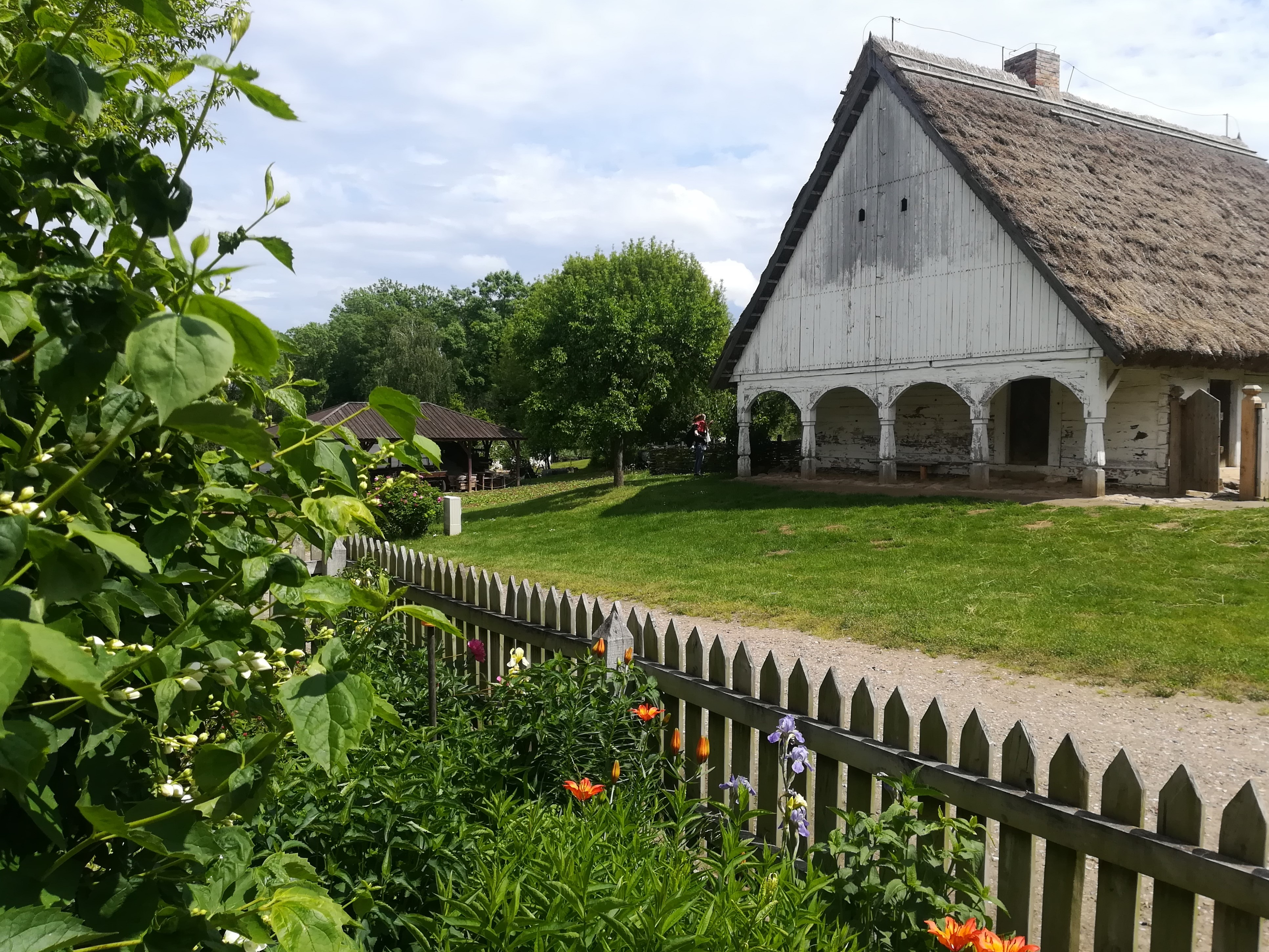

- Flag Coat of arms

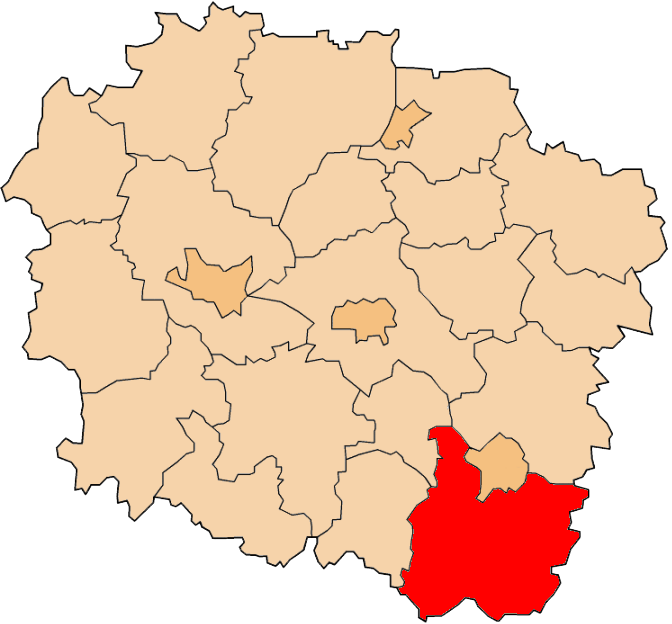
- Location within the voivodeship
- Coordinates (Włocławek): 52°39′N 19°3′E
- Country: Poland
- Voivodeship: Kuyavian-Pomeranian
- Seat: Włocławek
- Gminas: Total 13 (incl. 1 urban): Kowal; Gmina Baruchowo; Gmina Boniewo; Gmina Brześć Kujawski; Gmina Choceń; Gmina Chodecz; Gmina Fabianki; Gmina Izbica Kujawska; Gmina Kowal; Gmina Lubanie; Gmina Lubień Kujawski; Gmina Lubraniec; Gmina Włocławek

Area
  - Total: 1,472.34 km^{2} (568.47 sq mi)

Population (2019)
  - Total: 86,131
  - Density: 58.499/km^{2} (151.51/sq mi)
  - Urban: 17,014
  - Rural: 69,117
- Time zone: UTC+1 (CET)
  - Summer (DST): UTC+2 (CEST)
- Vehicle registration: CWL
- Website: www.powiat.wloclawski.pl

Włocławek County (Polish: powiat włocławski) is a unit of territorial administration and local government (powiat) in Kuyavian-Pomeranian Voivodeship, central Poland. It came into being on January 1, 1999, as a result of the Polish local government reforms passed in 1998. Its administrative seat is the city of Włocławek, although the city is not part of the county (it constitutes a separate city county). The county contains six towns: Brześć Kujawski, which lies 12 km (7 mi) south-west of Włocławek, Kowal, which lies 15 km (9 mi) south-east of Włocławek, Lubraniec, which lies 19 km (12 mi) south-west of Włocławek, Izbica Kujawska, which lies 33 km (21 mi) south-west of Włocławek, Chodecz, which lies 28 km (17 mi) south of Włocławek, and Lubień Kujawski, 29 km (18 mi) south of Włocławek.

The county covers an area of 1,472.34 square kilometres (568.5 sq mi). As of 2019 its total population is 86,131, out of which the population of Brześć Kujawski is 4,642, that of Kowal is 3,479, that of Lubraniec is 2,999, that of Izbica Kujawska is 2,609, that of Chodecz is 1,894, that of Lubień Kujawski is 1,391, and the rural population is 69,117.

== Neighbouring counties ==
Besides the city of Włocławek, Włocławek County is also bordered by Lipno County to the north, Płock County to the east, Gostynin County to the south-east, Kutno County and Koło County to the south, Radziejów County to the west, and Aleksandrów County to the north-west.

== Administrative divisions ==
The county is subdivided into 13 gminas (one urban, five urban-rural and seven rural). These are listed in the following table, in descending order of population.

Gmina	Type	Area (km^{2})	Population (2019)	Seat
Gmina Brześć Kujawski	urban-rural	150.4	11,506	Brześć Kujawski
Gmina Fabianki	rural	76.1	10,094	Fabianki
Gmina Lubraniec	urban-rural	148.2	9,442	Lubraniec
Gmina Choceń	rural	99.7	7,939	Choceń
Gmina Izbica Kujawska	urban-rural	132.1	7,677	Izbica Kujawska
Gmina Lubień Kujawski	urban-rural	150.2	7,373	Lubień Kujawski
Gmina Włocławek	rural	219.9	7,262	Włocławek *
Gmina Chodecz	urban-rural	122.2	6,026	Chodecz
Gmina Lubanie	rural	69.3	4,584	Lubanie
Gmina Kowal	rural	114.8	3,922	Kowal *
Kowal	urban	4.7	3,479	
Gmina Baruchowo	rural	107.1	3,441	Baruchowo
Gmina Boniewo	rural	77.7	3,386	Boniewo
* seat not part of the gmina

== Roads ==
Highway

- Autostrada A1/E75

Country Roads

- Country Road 1/E75
- Country Road 62
- Country Road 67
