= Bodzia Cemetery =

Medieval burial site in Poland

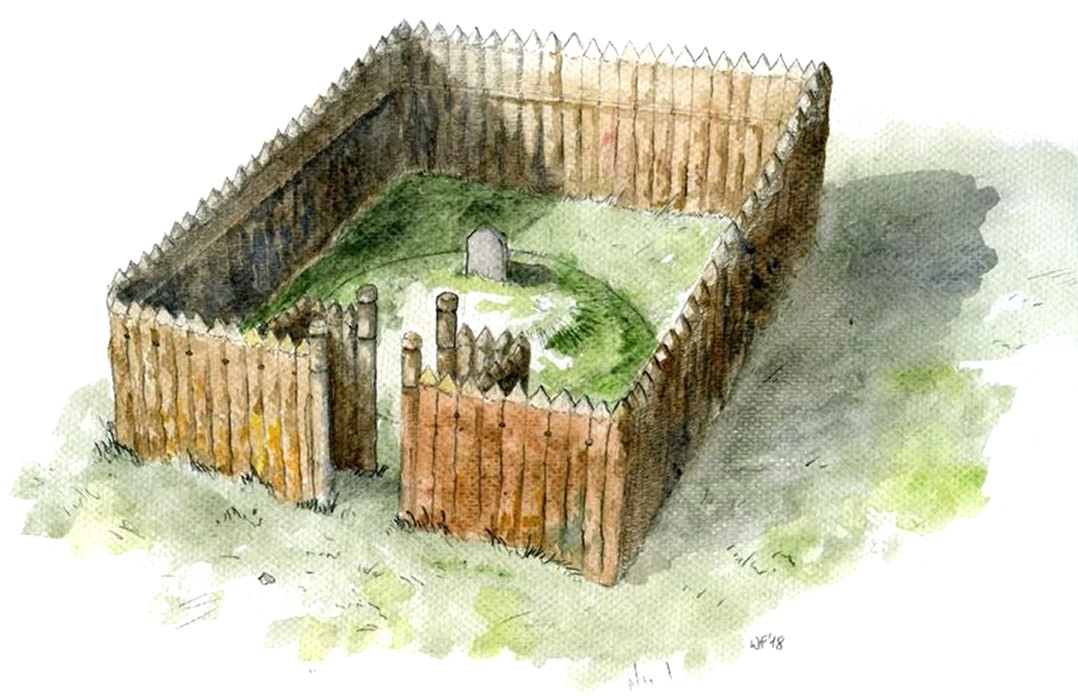
- Reconstruction of the cemetery
- Interactive map of Bodzia Cemetery
- 52°42′19″N 18°53′09″E
- Type: Chamber Burial
- Periods: Late 10th Century - Early 11th Century; Late 11th Century - Early 12th Century
- Location: Bodzia, Central Poland

Site notes
- Excavation dates: 2007-2009
- Archaeologists: Andrzej Buko
- Discovered: 2000

Bodzia Cemetery is a large 10th- to 11th-century chamber burial site in Bodzia, a town in the Kuyavia region of Central Poland, approximately 15 km to the northwest of Włocławek. A group from the Polish Academy of Sciences, led by Polish archaeologist, Andrzej Buko, excavated this site between 2007 – 2009. The excavation uncovered a large elite necropolis containing more than 58 graves, cenotaphs, weapons and riches. The Bodzia Cemetery is considered to be one of the most significant and "spectacular" early medieval findings in Poland in the last century. Artefacts uncovered in the site were mostly of foreign origin, which is atypical of other sites in the area. Information gleaned from the Bodzia Cemetery provided archaeologists with evidence of burial practices during the early medieval period in Poland.

Chamber burial sites were common in the area, being a primary practice within Old Rus, Scandinavian and Slavic countries in the Viking-Age. The study of Bodzia Cemetery is important, as it helps illustrate the socio-cultural and ethnic aspects of settled peoples in Poland, as reflected in the necropolis. The burial site indicates two separate periods of use. The first is from 980 to 1035 AD, and the second from the late 11th and early 12th centuries. There has been little evidence of an early settlement discovered, though, finds from a later settlement have been tentatively attributed to the second phase of the cemetery. The ethnicity of those buried at the site is inconclusive, as isotopic analysis of the remains indicate that they were from an unknown foreign origin. The site demonstrates burial rituals and artefacts of Kievan Rus, Scandinavian, Anglo-Saxon, Frisian and Khazar origin. The nature of multiculturality at the site, and proximity to the Vistula River trade route, indicates that it was perhaps a foreign trade settlement connecting the Baltic to the Byzantine Empire.

== History ==
The site of the Bodzia Cemetery is situated on a gradually eastward sloping flat morainic plateau that was formed during the Vistulan glaciation. Pottery fragments excavated at the burial site indicate that the area was historically inhabited by both Neolithic and Lusatian cultures. Use of the cemetery itself dates back to the 10th century, and remained an active burial ground until the early 13th century. The chamber burials indicate that the site was used in two periods during this time. One period was in the late 10th century – early 11th century, and the other in the late 11th – early 13th centuries. Chronological dating of the site was achieved by categorising uncovered coins, and radiocarbon dating wood and leather. Although above ground features may have been apparent during the Middle Ages, few indications of structures or grave markers have survived. This has been linked to the prevalence of agricultural use of the land from the 19th century onwards.

The site is located near Włocławek, on the Vistula River. This area had significant military importance as well as two common trade routes throughout the Piast period. During late 10th – early 11th centuries, under Bolesław the Brave’s reign, there was an influx of Scandinavian and Kievan mercenaries in Poland. Many of these people were migrants, merchants or foreign military officials allied to Poland during the Piast dynasty. The nature of excavated material at Bodzia indicates that the site is evidence of one such settlement, which was likely situated to the west of the Cemetery.

== Excavation ==
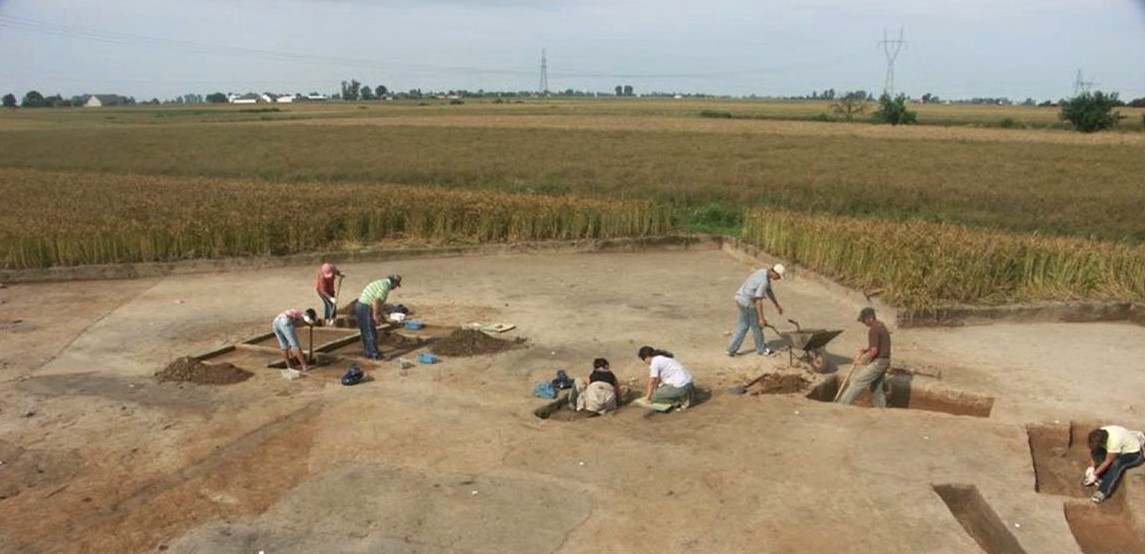
Excavation of the cemetery

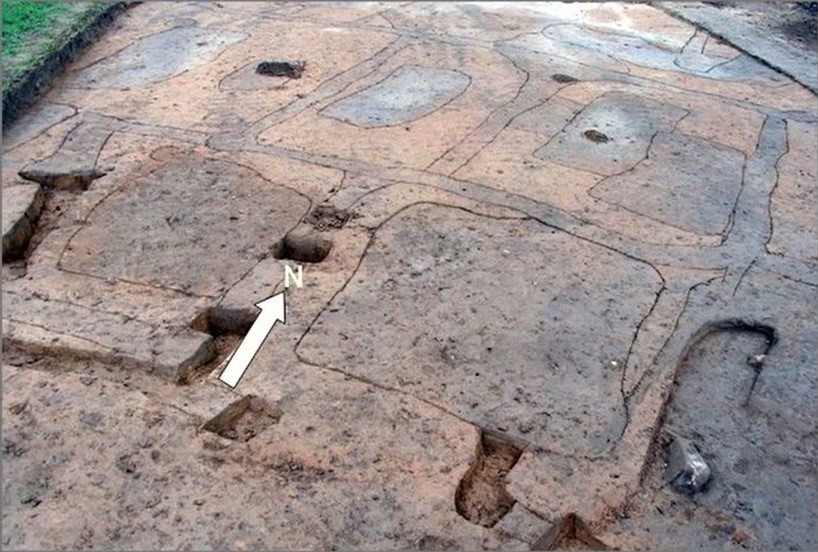
Graves

Bodzia Cemetery was discovered in 2000, during a field survey to establish the route of the A1 motorway. The excavation of the site began in 2004, and concluded in 2007, financed by the General Directorate for National Roads and Motorways. Over this time, 2069 important features were discovered over an area of three hectares. The Bodzia Cemetery is located at the southern end of the excavated site. As only the northern part of the Cemetery was initially uncovered, the size of the excavation was extended to include the whole necropolis. This subsequent excavation occurred in 2009, and was funded by both the National Institute of Heritage and the Polish Academy of Sciences.

The first stage of excavation began with the removal of humic topsoil by mechanical means. This method uncovered visible evidence of chamber burials, created by differences in soil composition. These burial chambers were subsequently excavated in three ways; the removal of soil in the entirety of a burial pit in the case of shallow graves; the removal of soil in half-sections, for graves inhabited by a single occupant; and the checkerboard pattern method of excavation for graves with multiple occupants. The site was subject to many specialist studies, including anthropological, archaeobotanical, petrographic and geomorphological analyses to garner a complete archaeological picture of the burial ground.

== Burials ==
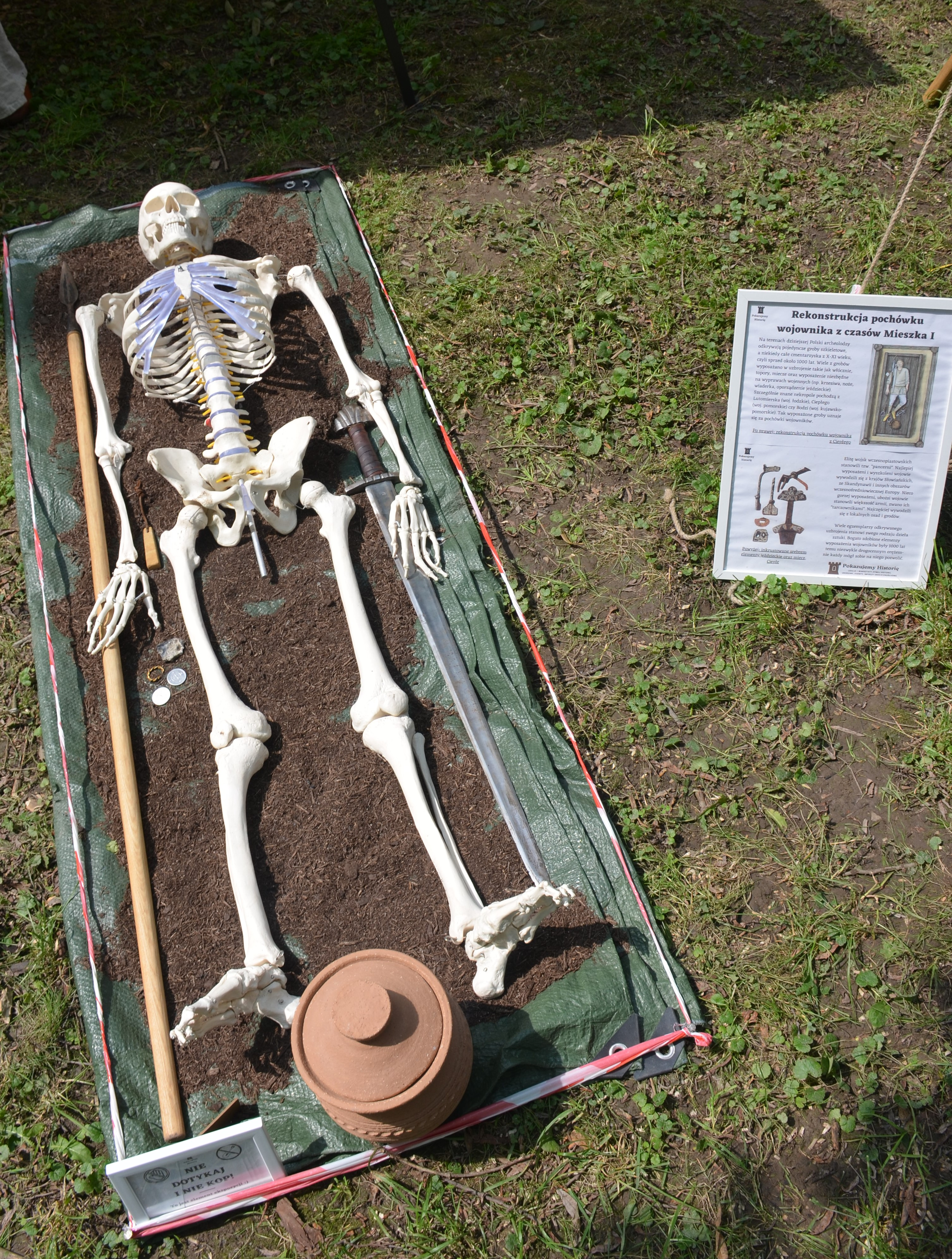
Reconstruction of early Piast warrior's burial from the second half of the 10th century

The excavation uncovered 52 human skeletons spread across 58 chamber graves. Some graves had no evidence of skeletal remains, either due to poor preservation, or because the chambers were used as cenotaphs. The nature of soil composition in some parts of the cemetery resulted in the leaching of calcium carbonates, which caused the human remains to become soft. Skeletal remains were better preserved in areas where the soil was less permeable. All uncovered remains did show a high degree of deterioration, especially those of young people, and those buried in shallow graves.

Anthropological research at the Nicolaus Copernicus University in Toruń determined that 14 of the recovered remains were male, and 21 were female. Bone deterioration of 17 remains was too severe for sex to be determined. Further research determined that 74% of the population in the necropolis were adults. The underrepresentation of children is atypical of burial grounds from the Middle Ages. Women exhumed from the cemetery were, on average, aged between 20 – 30 years, whereas the men were between the ages of 40 – 50. Lipinska and Kozlowski believed that the discrepancy between the ages of men and women was due to complications in female pregnancy, which reduced average life-span.

There are two distinct periods of burial indicated at the cemetery, separated by approximately 50 years. These have been determined by the differences in chronology and burial rites observed within the burial pits. The earlier period demonstrated burial rites that were atypical of other sites in Poland. The cemetery was organised and showed customs that are indicative of the burial of those of high social status. The graves were positioned in a north–south facing square shape, which is typical of Scandinavian burials. The imprint of a wooden post dug into the ground was discovered in one of the graves, a practice common amongst the Slavs and Scandinavian Rus.

The burial pits attributed to the later period contained a small number of graves: only eight graves with skeletal remains, and two cenotaphs. This indicates that a small selection of elite members of the later settlement were chosen to be buried at the site. Some of the later burials were partially dug into graves from the earlier period, though no graves were completely disturbed.

DNA analysis of the human remains concluded that although the exact nationality of those buried at Bodzia Cemetery could not be determined, the remains were not local, and may have been from southern Scandinavia, Ukraine, or Kievan Rus regions.

== Artefacts ==
528 preserved ‘small finds’ were excavated at Bodzia Cemetery. These were categorised into the following groups: weapons, tools, costume and ornaments, merchant items, and wood and ceramic containers.

=== Weapons ===
Five of the graves excavated at the site contained weapons. These weapons had elements associated with the elite classes of both Scandinavian and Rus cultures.

A battle knife with the remains of a sheath was found in a warrior's grave. The knife's blade was expertly crafted out of iron, with a hilt of antler and bone. The sheath was lined with animal hide, to protect the blade from freezing to the sheath, as well as from water damage. It is unknown whether the blade was double-edged, similar to a sword, or if it was single-edged and suffered significant erosion, effectively destroying the blunt back. Kara suggested that the latter explanation was most probable, making this the only discovered evidence of Scandinavian and Baltic inspired battle knives of this type found within the Early Piast state.

Iron sword positioned next to inhumed male warrior (left)

A sword was discovered in the grave of a 20 – 30-year-old man. From the positioning of the sword in relation to the body, it is supposed that the hilt may have been laid atop the man's shoulder, fastened with a type of bandolier. The original length of the sword is suspected to be approximately one metre, weighing 855 grams. The iron sword's hilt had silver inlays, as well as geometric ornaments of unique character, leading Kara to believe the sword was a special commission. The quality of the sword, as well as the unique decorations, indicated that it was probably a ceremonial weapon that also functioned as a combat sword.

An undecorated iron axe was discovered in the grave of an adult male. The axe, thought to have been used for combat, also contained symbolic elements of undetermined meaning. Dents along the blade of the axe were akin to marks found on elite Scandinavian weapons from both burial and ritual grounds. Axes have also been found in Rus and Polish burial grounds, though the find from Bodzia shares few stylistic similarities to those found elsewhere in Poland.

The remains of a poorly preserved wooden mace were discovered in the grave of an adult man aged between 30 – 40 years. The mace was laid across the body of the man, along his hip. The mace was made from oak and had undecorated bronze plaques attached. Due to bronze being fragile in battle, it is suspected that this mace was used primarily for ceremonial purposes, or as a military sign.

A well preserved iron arrow or spearhead was discovered in the grave of a poorly preserved individual of indeterminable age and sex. The weapon was 8.5 cm in length. The dimensions of the weapon indicate that it was likely from a light spear, intended to be thrown. This type of weapon was common across Western and Central Europe and was used in both Baltic and Slavic lands, but was uncommon amongst Scandinavian people.

=== Tools ===
Iron knives were a common find at the Bodzia burial site, with 33 specimens being found across 30 graves. Many of these were poorly preserved, though there were a few that had less significant corrosion damage. There were three types of knives found at the site, the most frequent being utility knives. There was no apparent correlation between the age and sex of individuals who had knives in their graves, as these items were spread out across male (11 specimens), female (6 specimens) and child (5 specimens) graves.

Some well preserved shears were found in the grave of an adult male (aged between 20 – 30 years) at the site. These shears had been placed under his belt at the time of his burial. Shears are a rare find in early medieval graves in Poland, and may have had a symbolic function when placed in a burial site.

Fragments of an iron padlock were found with the remains of a coffin containing a woman aged between 30 – 35 years. Near the padlock were the remains of an iron chain, indicating that the coffin had been chained closed. The woman inhumed in the grave had a fatal wound to the back of her head, indicating that this may have been a ritualistic burial, or it may have had symbolic meaning. Finds such as this are rare in early medieval Poland.

Two iron padlock keys were found in the graves of adult males (aged between 20 – 20 years old) at the site. These keys appear to correlate with the evidence of padlocks found in other graves at the site.

=== Costume and Ornaments ===
The remains of a leather item, thought to be a belt, were found near the pelvis of an inhumed male. Neither a buckle, nor other metal elements of a belt were found in the grave. This indicates that it was an ordinary belt not used to showcase the status of the wearer, or was perhaps a fastening used to tie together an overcoat or other garment made of fabric. This artifact features the distinctive trident symbol ('dvuzubets'), historically associated with the Rurikid dynasty of ancient Rus'. Some scholars suggest that this belt set could be dated to the era of Prince Svyatopolk Yaropolkovich of Turov, around 1008-1013 AD. The presence of this symbol in Bodzia indicates potential ties between the region and the Rus' nobility of the time. It's hypothesized that the individual buried in grave E-864/I might have been a swordsman in the service of Prince Svyatopolk, highlighting the cemetery's significance in understanding the socio-political landscape of early medieval Eastern Europe.

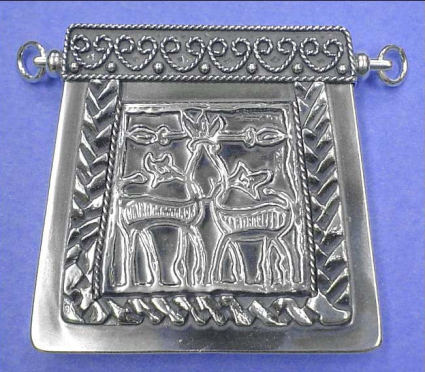
Silver kaptorga, similar to those found at Bodzia Cemetery

The remains of a scabbard were found in the grave of a male. A langsax type battle knife was found in the grave, along with the wood and leather remains of a scabbard. The leather used for the scabbard was tanned with animal hair. This is thought to be evidence of a continuing pagan tradition of Anglo-Saxon influence.

253 beads and other glass fragments were found across 10 graves at Bodzia cemetery. The grave of one woman aged between 20 – 25 years contained 164 silver and glass beads of different design. Another female's grave (aged between 20 – 30 years) contained 35 glass beads. Other glass beads of various colours and design were found across the site, some of the most distinct being decorated with gold foil. These beads are thought to have been imported from across Europe and the Near East, as many specimens had characteristics of Arabic and Byzantine craftmanship.

Three silver kaptorgi were found at the site. These are small boxes that are associated with magic and ancient ritual. They often contained amulets, precious items, or plant materials that were used to protect against evil. Two of these were decorated with a unique eagle design, the third was very poorly preserved. The eagle depicted on two of the kaptorgi did not have talons, which is a motif that has appeared in Merovingian and Anglo-Saxon cultures. Eagles were a common powerful motif in Roman, Greek, Scandinavian, Rus and Germanic cultures, though these depictions usually contained talons.

=== Merchant Items ===
A portable balance was found in a cenotaph. These merchant scales were made from brass, which was an exclusive metal during the Early Middle Ages. This artefact was incomplete, as neither the balance case, nor the weights were uncovered. Kara concluded that the scales had been dismantled before being deposited, as it was unlikely that the missing elements had corroded in the grave, and there was no sign of post-humous looting.

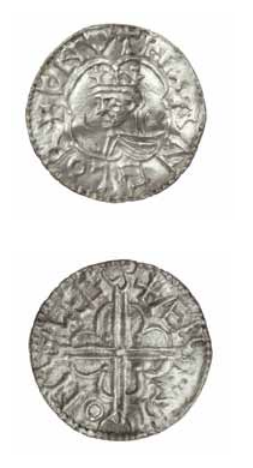
Dead man's obol: pence of King Cnut the Great (Fot./Photo M. Osiadacz)

The archaeological excavations at Bodzia Cemetery have unearthed a remarkable collection of coins, offering insights into the site's extensive cultural and trade connections during the 10th and 11th centuries. A total of 67 coins, comprising 12 complete pieces and 55 fragments, were found across 24 graves.

Notably, three of these coins were identified as Bohemian, reflecting the cemetery's ties with the region. These include one complete denier and a fragment from the reign of Boleslaus II (972–999), and another fragment from the time of Boleslaus III. The complete denier of Boleslaus II, discovered in the notable grave D162, features an intricate design with the 'Hand of God' and a symmetrical cross, crucial for dating the establishment of the cemetery.

The majority of coins originated from the Holy Roman Empire, with significant numbers from Saxony, Bavaria, and Franconia. There were also coins from England and Scandinavia. Some fragments were in poor condition, making precise identification challenging, and might include unfinished coins or replicas.

Specifically, in grave D171, a fragment of a denier of Boleslaus II was found inside the skull of a deceased woman, indicating burial customs where coins were placed with the dead. In the younger double-layer female grave E864/II, 16 fragments were discovered, including a half denier of Boleslaus III. Other significant finds in this grave included an Arabic dirhem, a Saxon cross-type denier, coins from the reigns of Otto III and Adelaide, Bolesław Chrobry (Boleslaus I of Poland), Richard I of Normandy, Bernard II, Duke of Saxony and Cnut the Great.

These coins not only illuminate the complex funerary practices at Bodzia but also reveal the cemetery's expansive trade networks and cultural interactions spanning medieval Europe.

=== Wood and Ceramic Containers ===
Two pottery vessels were found in fragments within two graves at the site. One clay vessel was found in the grave of an adult woman, aged between 20 – 25 years. The second vessel was found in the grave of an adult male. Neither object shows evidence that they were used for ritualistic or ceremonial purposes, rather, it is thought they were used for cooking.

Seven graves uncovered at Bodzia contained the remains of wooden buckets. These remains were mostly in the form of iron handles. buckets were found in the graves of females, one in a male's grave, and one in the grave of a child.

== DNA Results ==
DNA analysis was conducted on bone remains from five individuals at the Bodzia Cemetery. The individuals analyzed include:

- E63: A young adult male with an incomplete skeleton. A Type 1 axe head was located near his right femur, dating from 978 to 1016 CE.
- E864/I: An adult male accompanied by weapons, including a Petersen Type Z sword typical of the early to mid-11th century CE, dating from 1010 to 1020 CE.
- E58: An adult male maturus with an incomplete skeleton, found with a battle-knife of the langsax type, and other tools and iron knives near his arms and femur.
- E37: A young adult female with an incomplete skeleton, found with an iron bucket hoop near her feet, in a burial row dated between 980/990 and 1030/1035 CE.
- E870: An adult female aged 20–25 years, with an incomplete skeleton, buried with coins and a Volhynian slate whorl, dating from 1017 to 1023 CE.

The DNA samples were labeled as follows for analysis:

- VK153 for individual E63
- VK154 for individual E37
- VK155 for individual E870
- VK156 for individual E58
- VK157 for individual E864/I

It is noted that VK153, VK154, and VK156 are related and form one family unit. According to the dataset of Professor David Reich, the individuals from the Bodzia Cemetery elite burials form two family groups:

- VK155 and VK157 are closely related (possibly mother and son).
- The second family includes VK154 and VK156 as second-degree relatives; VK153 and VK154 are also second-degree relatives, with VK156 and VK153 identified as father and son.

DNA analysis revealed specific haplogroups for these individuals. The warrior in burial E864/I (sample VK157) belonged to the Y-chromosomal haplogroup I-Z63 (also known as I1a3) and mitochondrial haplogroup H1c. Sample VK156 showed Y-chromosomal haplogroup R1a1a1b1a2a-Z92 and mitochondrial haplogroup J1c2c2a. Sample VK153 belonged to Y-chromosomal haplogroup R1a1a-M198 and mitochondrial haplogroup H1c3, while VK155 and VK154 were identified with mitochondrial haplogroup H1c and H1c3, respectively.

== Interpretation ==
Controversy in regard to the interpretation of some elements of the site has arisen due to the limitations of archaeological analysis. Drodz-Lipinska and Kozlowski determined that the low life-expectancy of those within the Bodzia Cemetery could be indicative of the local inhabitants’ vulnerability to the local environment. They noted the limitations of this claim, due to the small sample size of inhumations. This sentiment was echoed by Neil Price, who acknowledged the difficulty of definitive scholarship in such areas. However, the results of stable isotope analyses of strontium, oxygen, and carbon from samples taken from a portion of the graves suggest that the majority of individuals examined so far buried at the Bodzia Cemetery were not local to the area. They were newcomers from another region, as indicated by individuals buried in graves D152, D160, D164, E33, E34, E37, E58, E864/I, E864/II, E870, and E872. Determining their exact origins at this stage is not possible. The strontium values obtained for these individuals are characteristic of areas with geological substrates of carbonate rocks or loess, which are known from several areas in Europe including southern and eastern Poland (Lesser Poland and the Lublin region), southern Scandinavia (Denmark and Scania), as well as various regions of Central (e.g., Hungary) and Western Europe, and also Ukraine. Douglas Price and Karin Frei suggested that they might have come from the vicinity of Kyiv, Ukraine, and based on the research conducted so far, this seems quite plausible. Additionally, isotopic analyses of bone samples from two graves showed that a man buried in grave D162 had a diet based on C3 plants (grains, vegetables, and fruits) and animal products (meat, milk, eggs), similar to the diet of individuals buried at the early medieval cemetery in Giecz. Meanwhile, the diet of a woman buried in grave E864/II was based on the consumption of C3 plants and possibly C4 plants, with a significant proportion of animal products. Her diet was similar to the diet of the early medieval population from Kałdus, site 4, and the population from the Roman influence period buried in Rogowo.

Andrzej Buko raised the issue that some of the artefacts discovered in the burial pits were deposited taphonomically. These included pottery fragments, which were excluded from the study. Some other grave goods may also have been unintentionally deposited in the site.

The Bodzia Cemetery exhibits significant architectural and cultural parallels with the Jelling complex in Denmark, indicative of a strong Viking Age influence. Key aspects of this connection include:

1. Architectural Resemblance: The cemetery's layout, particularly the central mausoleum and rectangular palisade enclosures, mirrors similar structures in Zealand and Scania, akin to the sepulchral complex at Jelling.
2. Royal Burial Grounds: The palisade enclosures in Bodzia share design similarities with the royal burial mounds at Jelling, reflecting a common tradition in burial practices.
3. Danish Traditions: The cemetery's planning and development align with Danish feudal estates and aristocratic power structures from the Viking Age, drawing from the monumental style seen in Jelling.
4. Burial Patterns and Rapid Development: Both Jelling and Bodzia feature large rectangular burial pits and the interment of individuals with Scandinavian origins, with both sites undergoing rapid development within a short timeframe.
5. Ethnographic Ties: The primary burial row at Bodzia, initiated by tomb D162, likely includes individuals of Scandinavian origin, underscoring the site's deep Scandinavian cultural connections.
6. Innovative Design: The unique designs of Jelling and Bodzia, particularly in their burial patterns and structures, did not find immediate imitation elsewhere during the same period, highlighting their innovative nature.

These findings suggest that the Bodzia Cemetery not only reflects the influence of Danish Viking Age traditions but also stands as a unique and innovative site within this cultural context.

According to Professor Duczko, the interpretation of grave E864/I in Bodzia Cemetery suggests stronger Scandinavian ties than previously assumed. The grave's belt strap-end, initially linked to the Rurikid dynasty due to its bident symbol and Glagolitic letters, is now thought to depict Thor's hammer, Mjölnir, instead of a Christian cross. This reinterpretation is an evolving perspective, indicating the need to reevaluate the warrior's social status and the origins of Rurikid symbolism, and adds depth to our understanding of the cemetery's complex historical and cultural influences. This is only one interpretation among others.
