= Clan Hamilton =

Lowland Scottish clan

- Hamaltan
- Crest: In a ducal cornet an oak tree fructed and penetrated transversely in the main stem by a frame saw Proper, the frame Or
- Motto: Through (Scottish Gaelic: Troimh)

Profile
- Region: Lowlands

Chief
- Alexander Douglas-Hamilton
- The 16th Duke of Hamilton and the 13th Duke of Brandon
- Seat: Lennoxlove House
- Historic seat: Hamilton Palace
Clan branches
Hamilton of Hamilton (chiefs)
Hamilton of Abercorn (senior cadets)
Hamilton family
Allied clans
Clan Douglas
Titles
Titles of Hamilton in Scotland, Ireland, England, Great Britain, and the United Kingdom
- Duke of Hamilton
- Duke of Abercorn
- Duke of Brandon
- Marquess of Abercorn
- Marquess of Clydesdale
- Marquess of Douglas
- Marquess of Hamilton
- Earl of Arran
- Earl of Abercorn
- Earl of Cambridge
- Earl of Clanbrassil
- Earl of Haddington
- Earl of Lanark
- Earl of Orkney
- Earl of Ruglen
- Earl of Selkirk
- Viscount Boyne
- Viscount Claneboye
- Viscount Hamilton
- Viscount Riccartoun
- Viscount Strabane
- Baron Dutton
- Baron Hamilton of Dalzell
- Baron Hamilton of Epsom
- Baron Hamilton of Glenawly
- Baron Hamilton of Strabane
- Baron Innerdale
- Baron Mountcastle
- Baron Brancepeth
- Lord Abercorn
- Lord Aven and Innerdale
- Lord Bargeny
- Lord Belhaven and Stenton
- Lord Hillhouse
- Lord Machanshire and Polmont
- Lord Paisley
- Lord Pressmennan
Titles of Hamilton in France
- Duc de Châtellerault
Titles of Hamilton in the Holy Roman Empire
- Reichsgraf von Hamilton zu Neuburg
- Prince-Bishop of Olomouc
Titles of Hamilton in Sweden
- Greve Hamilton
- Friherre Hamilton af Deserf
- Friherre Hamilton af Hageby

The Clan Hamilton, or House of Hamilton, is a Scottish clan of the Scottish Lowlands.

== History ==
=== Origins of the house ===
Undifferenced arms of the chief of Clan Hamilton, gules, three cinquefoils ermine

The Hamilton chiefs descend from Walter fitz Gilbert of Hambledon, who appears in a charter to the Monastery of Paisley in about 1294. His lands appear to have originally been in Renfrewshire, however, his support for Robert the Bruce rewarded him with lands in Lanarkshire and the Lothians. These lands included Cadzow, which later became the town of Hamilton, South Lanarkshire.

Chief among the legends still clinging to this important family is that which gives a descent from the House of Beaumont, a branch of which is stated to have held the manor of Hamilton, Leicestershire; and it is argued that the three cinquefoils of the Hamilton shield bear some resemblance to the single cinquefoils of the Beaumonts. In face of this it has been recently shown that the single cinquefoil was also borne by the Umfravilles of Northumberland, who appear to have owned a place called Hamilton in that county. It may be pointed out that Simon de Montfort, the great earl of Leicester, in whose veins flowed the blood of the Beaumonts, obtained about 1245 the wardship of Gilbert de Umfraville, second earl of Angus, and it is conceivable that this name Gilbert may somehow be responsible for the legend of the Beaumont descent, seeing that the first authentic ancestor of the Hamiltons is one Walter FitzGilbert. He first appears in 1294–1295 as one of the witnesses to a charter by James, the high steward of Scotland, to the monks of Paisley; and in 1296 his name appears in the Homage Roll as Walter FitzGilbert of "Hameldone." Who this Gilbert of "Hameldone" may have been is uncertain.

— Encyclopædia Britannica (1911).

=== Wars of Scottish Independence ===
Walter Fitz Gilbert was rewarded with lands for his support of king Robert the Bruce. Walter's son, David, fought at the Battle of Neville's Cross for David II of Scotland in 1346. David was captured and was not released until a substantial ransom was paid.

=== 15th and 16th centuries ===
In 1474, James Hamilton, 1st Lord Hamilton, married Princess Mary, daughter of James II of Scotland Their son was James Hamilton, 1st Earl of Arran. The family extended Brodick Castle on the Isle of Arran. The second Earl of Arran, James Hamilton, Duke of Châtellerault, was heir to the throne of both James IV of Scotland and Mary, Queen of Scots. He was made regent of Scotland while the queen was still a child and proposed to marry his son to her, in order to secure his claim to the throne. At this time, Friar Mark Hamilton wrote a family history.

However, the royal marriage did not take place and Mary married an heir to the French throne instead. James Hamilton was created Duke of Châtellerault because he had figured prominently in the marriage negotiations with France. In 1561, he was sent into exile for five years because he openly opposed Mary's marriage to Henry Stuart, Lord Darnley, having had his hopes rekindled when Mary's marriage ended upon the death of the Dauphin of France.

James Hamilton of Bothwellhaugh was a Scottish supporter of Mary, Queen of Scots, who assassinated James Stewart, 1st Earl of Moray, Regent of Scotland, in January 1570.

The 4th Earl of Arran, James Hamilton, 2nd Marquess of Hamilton, became Lord Chancellor of Scotland and was made keeper of both of the strategic royal castles; Edinburgh Castle and Stirling Castle. He had been advanced to the rank of marquess in 1599. His brother was Claud Hamilton, 1st Lord Paisley, who had been created Lord Paisley in 1587 and later Lord Abercorn. This branch of the family also prospered and Abercorn was advanced to an earldom and later a dukedom in 1868.

=== 17th century and civil war ===
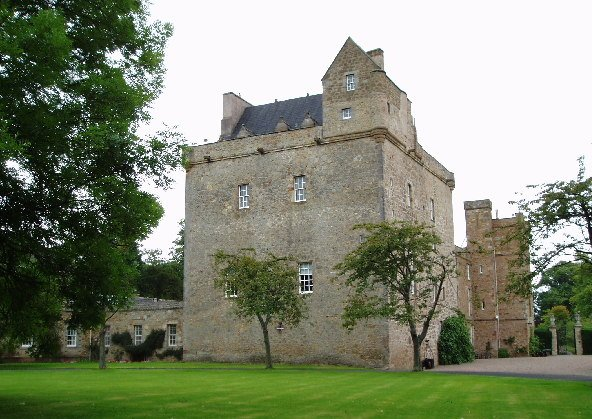
Lennoxlove House

The third Marquess, James Hamilton, 1st Duke of Hamilton, was a staunch supporter of Charles I. Charles rewarded him with the dukedom in 1643, which made Hamilton the premier peer in Scotland. Hamilton led a royalist army into England but was defeated at the Battle of Preston (1648) by the Parliamentarians of Oliver Cromwell. Hamilton was later executed in 1649 at Whitehall, shortly before the king met the same fate. Hamilton's brother, William Hamilton, 2nd Duke of Hamilton, was also a brave soldier but was killed at the Battle of Worcester in 1651. The title passed to Anne Hamilton, 3rd Duchess of Hamilton, daughter of the first Duke. She was a woman of great intellect but she inherited estates heavily burdened by debt. Matters were made worse with her kinsman Hamilton, Earl of Abercorn, challenged her right to succeed to the title. Anne married William Douglas, 1st Earl of Selkirk (later Duke of Hamilton). Their son was James Hamilton, 4th Duke of Hamilton, who was killed in a controversial duel in London in 1712.

== Seat of the chief ==
Hamilton Palace in Hamilton, South Lanarkshire, had been the family's seat from the 13th century. Built by Duchess Anne and her husband, William Douglas, 3rd Duke of Hamilton, it had the distinction of being one of the largest non-royal palaces in Europe, reaching its greatest extent under the 10th and 11th dukes in the mid nineteenth century.

Excessive subsidence of the palace caused by the family's mines led to its condemnation and demolition in 1921. The 13th Duke then moved to Dungavel House, near Strathaven. This was where deputy-führer Rudolf Hess aimed to reach during his doomed peace mission to see Douglas, 14th Duke of Hamilton, in 1941.

In 1947, Dungavel was sold to the coal board, and then on to the government, which turned it into an open prison. Currently, it is the site of a controversial holding centre for asylum-seekers.

The family moved to Lennoxlove House in East Lothian, which remains the residence of the current Duke.

=== Other properties ===
- Brodick Castle, Brodick, Isle of Arran
- Cadzow Castle, Hamilton, Lanarkshire
- Chelsea Place, London
- Craignethan Castle, South Lanarkshire
- Easton Park
- Kerelaw House, Grange, Ayrshire
- Kinneil House, Bo'ness, West Lothian
- Lochranza Castle, Lochranza, Isle of Arran
- Redhouse Tower, Longniddry, East Lothian
- Oldwoodhouselee Castle, Midlothian, Scotland

== Tartan ==
Tartan image	Notes
	Hamyltowne tartan, as published in 1842 in Vestiarium Scoticum; note: the modern thread count calls for more than one white line.

== Swedish branch ==
Malcolm Hamilton Archbishop of Cashel, first son was Hugh Hamilton, 1st Viscount of Glenawly, a soldier in Swedish service, who in Sweden was created baron of Deserf. Captain John Hamilton of Monea was Malcolm's younger son. His sons, Malcolm and Hugo, went to Swedish service in 1655 and were in 1689 created barons of Hagaby. They stayed in Swedish service and Malcolm's son Gustaf David Hamilton was named the title of count in 1751, and in 1765 he gained the rank of field marshal.

== Dutch branch ==
John Jack Hamilton was born on 13 August 1640 in Dromore, Kirkcudbright, South Scotland. He joined the Scots Brigade and served as the palfrenier to the Governor of 's-Hertogenbosch, John Kirkpatrick. In 1679 he married Maria Wijgherganck. He is the progenitor of the Dutch branch of the Hamilton family.

== German branch ==
John James Hamilton (1642–1717) went after Glorious Revolution to Germany, where he served for Philip William, Elector Palatine.

The last of his descendants was Maximilian von Hamilton, Bishop of Olomouc (1714–1776).

== American Branch ==
Alexander Hamilton, one of the Founding Fathers of the United States, was the grandson of Alexander Hamilton, the laird of Grange, Ayrshire, who was himself descendant of the Cambuskeith branch of Clan Hamilton. His Y-DNA Haplogroup was I1a.

Descendants of this branch have been recorded to the sixth generation in the United States and likely survive today.

== Hamilton DNA Project ==
The Hamilton DNA Project, involving hundreds of participants including a close relative of the current Duke of Abercorn, has made significant contributions to understanding the genetic lineage of Clan Hamilton. The genetic research conducted by the Hamilton DNA Project has demonstrated that all Hamilton branches descending from Sir James Hamilton, 5th Laird of Cadzow, who is the progenitor of both the mentioned branches of the Dukes of Abercorn and the Dukes of Hamilton until 1895, belong to the Y-DNA Haplogroup I-Z63. This finding suggests a most recent common ancestor for these branches who lived about 750 years ago.

== See also ==
- Duke of Hamilton
- Duke of Abercorn
- Earl of Selkirk
- Earl of Arran (Scotland)
- Viscount Boyne
- Lord Belhaven and Stenton
- Baron Hamilton of Dalzell
- Lennoxlove House
- Hamilton family – descendants of the Hamilton clan in the United States
