= Haplogroup I-Z63 =

Human Y-chromosome DNA haplogroup

Haplogroup I1a3 (I-Z63)
- Possible time of origin: 4,600 years ago (2600 BC
- Possible place of origin: Denmark
- Ancestor: I1a (I-DF29)

Haplogroup I-Z63, also known as I1a3 per the International Society of Genetic Genealogy ('ISOGG), is a Y chromosome haplogroup. It is correlated with a DYS456 value inferior to 15, but there are exceptions.

I-Z63 is most common in England, Scotland, Germany, Fennoscandia and Poland. Its progenitor is assumed to have lived in Jutland at around 2500 BCE. The earliest archeological sample for I-Z63 is indeed connected to an individual from near Hjørring in Jutland, present Denmark. Within Fennoscandia, I-Z63 has a particularly strong association with Finland. To date, ancient I-Z63 has been found archeologically in historic Jutland (present Denmark and Germany) along with Poland, Hungary, Turkey and Italy.

== Origins ==
On the basis of analysing samples of volunteers in YDNA sequencing, the YDNA analysis company YFull estimated that I-Z63 formed 4,600 years ago (2600 BC) (95% CI 5,100 <-> 4,000 ybp) with a TMRCA (Time to Most Recent Common Ancestor) of 4,400 years (95% CI 4,900 <-> 3,900 ybp) before present.

The earliest archeological sample of I-Z63 is CGG106524, found in Jutland at the Hestehavens Mose site, near Hjørring in Denmark. The sample is from the pre-roman iron age, between 400-220 BC, whereby C14 dating revealed an age of 2,275 years before present. The haplogroup was determined as I1a3a1a2a1b1a (PH3482/Y7627). This is a haplogroup situated in the I-BY316 subclade of I-Z63. The PH3482 haplogroup is estimated to have formed 2,800 ybp by YFull.

Geographically I-Z63 is believed to have arisen in or near what is now Denmark (based in part on the current distribution of this haplogroup). The current distribution of I-Z63 shows that there is a very high concentration of I-Z63 on the British Isles. At the same time, the archeological record presents a strong association of I-Z63 to the Wielbark culture and by extension with the Goths. There is a proposed link between the Goths and British migration, the so-called "Jutish Hypothesis". The "Jutish hypothesis" claims that the Jutes may be synonymous with the Geats of southern Sweden or their neighbours, the Gutes. The evidence adduced for this theory includes:

- primary sources referring to the Geats (Geátas) by alternative names such as Iútan, Iótas and Eotas;
- Asser in his Life of Alfred (893) identifies the Jutes with the Goths (in a passage claiming that Alfred the Great was descended, through his mother, Osburga, from the ruling dynasty of the Jutish kingdom of Wihtwara, on the Isle of Wight), and;
- the Gutasaga (13th Century) states that some inhabitants of Gotland left for mainland Europe; large burial sites attributable to either Goths or Gepids were found in the 19th century near Willenberg, Prussia (after 1945 Wielbark in Poland).

The Jutes invaded and settled in southern Britain in the late 4th century during the Age of Migrations, as part of a larger wave of Germanic settlement in the British Isles. The Jutish migration to Britain may explain the high concentration of I-Z63 found in modern Britain. However, I-Z63 is notably sparse among modern volunteer testers from Denmark. This is surprising because, in a geographical sense, Denmark encompasses the ancient homeland of the Jutes. Foreign invaders displacing the Jutes from their ancient homeland may explain the relative lack of I-Z63 in Denmark. Even in the year 945, the peoples of Jutland were threatened by foreign invaders (yet ironically were posing a threat to other groups elsewhere, such as in England). In 945 King Hacon of Norway arrived in Jutland and slew many of the people there, sending the survivors "far up into the land". The current distribution of I-Z63 clearly shows that while there is a near absence of I-Z63 in modern Denmark, sizable numbers of I-Z63 men live today in Finland, Norway, Sweden and Aland.

Based on the combined evidence, the preferred current working hypothesis puts the progenitor of I-Z63 in ancient Jutland around the year 2000 BCE.

== Archeological Record ==
An individual (sample CGG106524) with the subclade I1a3a1a2a1b1a (PH3482/Y7627) was found near Hjørring in Jutland, Denmark with C14 dating placing the sample at 2,275 ybp, i.e. the pre-roman Iron Age.

An individual with the subclade of I-Y21381 was found just south of Denmark in the Schleswig Rathausmarkt excavation in Schleswig, Schleswig-Holstein, Germany. This city on the Jutland peninsula is the successor to the important Viking settlement of Hedeby, which was destroyed in 1066. Sample SWG007 was obtained from grave 179 and dated to 1070-1140 CE.

Data from a yet unpublished study out of Stockholm University: "Beyond the Binary? A Multi-Method Approach to Sexing Children at the Viking Age Site of Ihre, Gotland" references 6 Viking Age samples of haplogroup I-Z63 (in subclade I-BY316) from the Swedish island of Gotland in the Baltic Sea. All of them belong to branch I-FT140572 (formed c. 350 BCE), joining 2 testers with ancestry from the UK and Slovenia. Per FamilyTree DNA's preliminary analysis, 5 of the samples can be used to create a new branch, I-FTJ74, sharing 2 SNPs. The 6th sample lacks coverage for the novel mutations.

The I-S2077 subclade of haplogroup I-Z63 was sampled on an elite warrior buried in Bodzia Cemetery in a rich burial from ca. 1010-1020 AD. All artefacts there indicate a strong relation to the Kievian Rus ruling elite, so this man who probably succumbed to combat wounds, was in a close relationship with the Kievian Prince, Sviatopolk the Accursed (son of Vladimir the Great), married to a daughter of the Polish king Boleslaw the Great (Burisleifr from the Scandinavian sagas). The cemetery in Bodzia is exceptional in terms of Scandinavian and Kievian Rus links. The Bodzia man (sample VK157, or burial E864/I) was not a simple warrior from the princely retinue, but he belonged to the princely family himself. His burial is the richest one in the whole cemetery, moreover, Strontium analysis of his teeth enamel shows he was not local. It is assumed that he came to Poland with the Prince of Kiev, Sviatopolk the Accursed, and met a violent death in combat. This corresponds to the events of 1018 AD when Sviatopolk himself disappeared after having retreated from Kiev to Poland. It cannot be excluded that the Bodzia man was Sviatopolk himself, as the genealogy of the Rurikids at this period is extremely sketchy and the dates of birth of many princes of this dynasty may be quite approximative.

Another archeological sample possibly tied to the Kievan Rus is sample Zeytinliada 14832, which belongs to an 25 to 35 year old adult who lived between 600 and 1000 CE during the Medieval Age and was found in the region now known as Zeytinliada, Erdek, Turkey. This sample has been tied to subclade I-Y3979. The genetic profile of this individual does not resemble northern Europeans, so he might be the descendant of a northern European (e.g. part of the Varangian guard of Byzantium) who intermarried with the local population, although a more proximal origin is also possible, as this lineage was found also in Langobards from Hungary. The Rus' provided the earliest members of the Varangian Guard. They were in Byzantine service from as early as 874. Hence it appears plausible that sample Bodzia 157 and Zeytinliada 148 are both connected to the Kievan Rus.

I-Z63 has been traced to the Kowalewko burial site in Poland which dates to the Roman Iron Age. In 2017 Polish researchers could successfully assign YDNA haplogroups to 16 individuals who were buried at the site. Out of these 16 individuals three belonged to haplogroup I-Z63, and in particular subclade I-L1237. The Kowalewko archeological site has been associated with the Wielbark culture. The Wielbark culture in turn has been associated with the Goths. Therefore the subclade I-L1237 of I-Z63 may be seen somewhat as a genetic indicator of the Gothic tribe of late antiquity. There is an academic theory that the Gothic tribe is connected to British migration through the so-called "Jutish Hypothesis", which would explain why I-L1237 is so strongly associated both with British migration and with Gothic migration patterns.

I-Z63 was found in a late 6th Century cemetery in Collegno, Italy, near the city of Torino. The Collegno burial site is associated with Gothic and Lombard remains and dated to the late 6th Century. The sample CL63 was unusual because in terms of autosomal DNA CL63 was a sole outlier, perhaps someone living in exile but accepted as part of the kinship group. CL63 is of subclade I-FT104588, which in turn matches Visigoth sample I41203 found in Bulgaria. There is a hypothesis that sample CL63 may be connected with deposed Visigoth King Suintila. Other than circumstantial evidence of carbon dated timelines plus aDNA and yDNA genetic data, there is also a genealogical hypothethis that the Swend lineage of medieval Burgheim may descend via the surviving son of Suintila who may have accompanied Langobard Queen Gundeberga in her own escape to Burgheim(Lahr).

Another I-Z63 archeological find at the Crypta Balbi site in Rome was dated to Late Antiquity (400-600 CE) and reported to be Y-DNA haplogroup I-Y7234. Interestingly, Lombard-associated ornaments have been excavated at this site, pointing to connections with central Europe. Additionally, five of the seven individuals from this site, including the I-Z63 individual, were classified by ChromoPainter into a cluster with more haplotype sharing with central/northern Europeans.

Excavated in Hungary, Tiszafüred 798 was a man, associated with the Late Avar cultural group, who lived between 700 and 800 CE during the Medieval Age and was found in the region now known as Majoros-halom, Tiszafüred. Likewise Tiszafüred 509 was a man who lived between 800 and 830 CE. Both were matched to haplogroup I-S10360. Avars, under the rule of a khagan called Bayan, 565 AD, allied with the Longobards and defeated the Germanic Gepides in the Danube Plains. In 7th c. AD they continued raiding Western Europe. They helped the lombard king Grimoald to vanquish a rebellion in Frioul, 663 AD. Hence a plausible explanation exists how a haplogroup which is strongly associated with the Gothic migrations is also attached to the Avar cultural group. Also found in Hungary was Magyarhomorog 88 who belongs to subclade Y2245/PR683, he was a man who lived between 1000 and 1100 CE during the Medieval Age and was found in the region now known as Kónyadomb, Magyarhomorog, Hungary.

== Notable members of I-Z63 ==
The genetic analysis of sample VK157 from the Bodzia Cemetery presents a compelling case for a connection to Sviatopolk I of Kiev. Although this link is highly probable based on current data, the assertion that VK157 was Sviatopolk himself remains hypothetical as of now, there is no definitive evidence confirming this. From a genetic standpoint, VK157 has been identified as possessing SNP 300756, which is unique to the I-Y45113 branch (subclade of haplogroup I-Z63). This specific genetic marker classifies VK157 within this branch, contributing to the broader narrative of the population's genetic history in the region. However, interpretations of VK157's historical identity remain speculative and should be cautiously considered, aligning with scholarly caution.

Another hypothetical association of an archeological sample with a named historic person is that of Collegno sample CL63 with Visigoth King Suintila. The hypothesis is made via strong corroberation of carbon dated timelines, yDNA and aDNA with historical sources, plus the genealogical evidence that the prospective lineage of his surviving son Reccimer in Burgheim(Lahr) re-emerges after the dark ages in 1290 CE under the surname Swend. This is combined with the fact that in 1604 a later descendant of the same lineage claimed ancient Roman status from the German emperor Rudolf II via his proxy the leading Latin scholar Dr. Johann Wilhelm Ganzhorn. Imperial recognition was granted and a surviving letter of protection underwritten by the emperor was hence issued

The Hamilton DNA Project, involving hundreds of participants including a close relative of the current Duke of Abercorn, has made significant contributions to understanding the genetic lineage of Clan Hamilton, a prominent Lowland Scottish clan. The clan, tracing its roots back to Walter fitz Gilbert of Hambledon in 14th-century Lanarkshire, has a rich history, with its chiefs ascending to various noble titles over the centuries. One branch of the clan acquired titles including Laird of Cadzow, Lord Hamilton, Earl of Arran, Marquess of Hamilton, and Duke of Hamilton, with the dukedom passing to Clan Douglas in 1895 after the 12th Duke of Hamilton died without a male heir. Another branch ascended to the titles of Lords Paisley, Earls of Abercorn, Marquesses of Abercorn, and Dukes of Abercorn, a title that continues to this day. The genetic research conducted by the Hamilton DNA Project has demonstrated that all Hamilton branches descending from Sir James Hamilton, 5th Laird of Cadzow, who is the progenitor of both the mentioned branches, belong to the I1-Z63. This finding suggests a most recent common ancestor for these branches who lived about 750 years ago.

One of the prominent members of this haplogroup is the 21st president of the United States, Chester A. Arthur (1829-1886). His lineage is believed to belong to haplogroup I1-Z63 > BY151 > BY351 based on results from the Arthur family DNA project.

Another notable member is Richard Bradberry (ca 1775-ca 1826) of King William County, Virginia. He is considered the common ancestor of a cluster of individuals belonging to haplogroup I-Z63.

Governor William Bradford, Mayflower passenger and leader of the Plymouth Colony. At least two reported descendants have tested under I-Z63 to I-Y21381 > Y21371 > Y21370 > Y21372 > FGC72882.
