= Jutes =

North Sea Germanic ethnic group from the Jutlandic peninsula

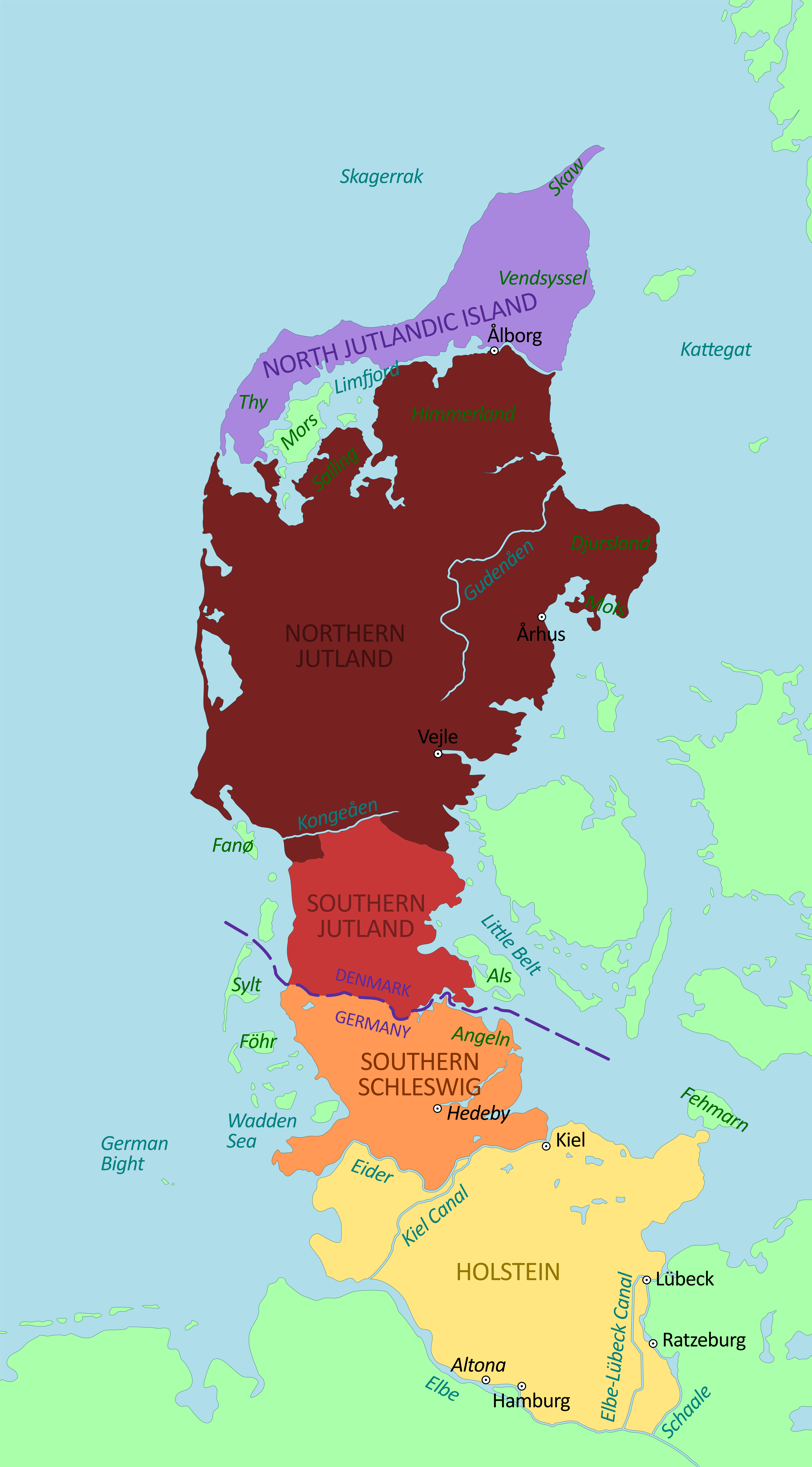
The Jutland Peninsula, possible homeland of the Jutes

The Jutes (/dʒuːts/ JOOTS) (Note: Latin: Iuti or Iutæ; Danish: Jyder; Old Norse: Jótar; Old English: Ēotas) were one of the Germanic tribes who settled in Great Britain after the departure of the Romans. According to Bede, they were one of the three most powerful Germanic nations, along with the Angles and the Saxons:

Those who came over were of the three most powerful nations of Germany—Saxons, Angles, and Jutes. From the Jutes are descended the people of Kent, and of the Isle of Wight, and those also in the province of the West Saxons who are to this day called Jutes, seated opposite to the Isle of Wight.

— Bede 1910, 1.15

There is no consensus amongst historians on the origins of the Jutes. One hypothesis is that they originated from the Jutland Peninsula but after a Danish invasion of that area, migrated to the Frisian coast. From the Frisian coast they went on to settle southern Britain in the later fifth century during the Migration Period, as part of a larger wave of Germanic migration into Britain.

== Settlement in southern Britain ==
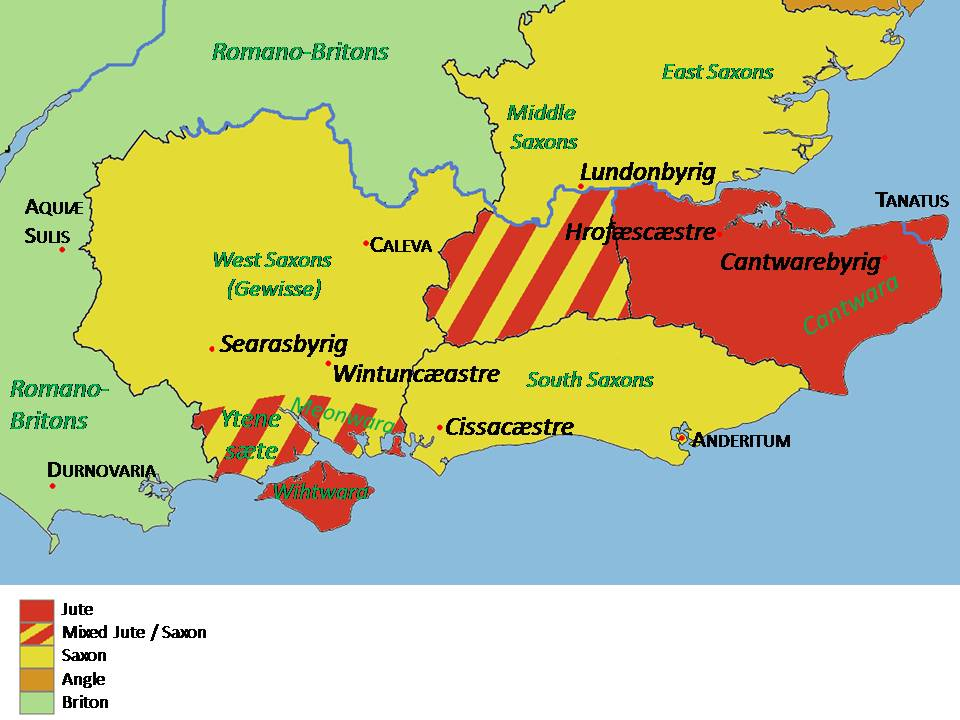
A map of Jutish settlements in Britain circa 575

During the period after the Roman occupation and before the Norman conquest, people of Germanic descent arrived in Britain, ultimately forming England. The Anglo-Saxon Chronicle provides what historians regard as foundation legends for Anglo-Saxon settlement.

The Anglo-Saxon Chronicle describes how the brothers Hengist and Horsa in the year 449 were invited to Sub-Roman Britain by Vortigern to help his forces in fighting the Picts. They landed at Wippidsfleet (Ebbsfleet), and went on to defeat the Picts wherever they fought them. Hengist and Horsa sent word home to Germany asking for help. Their request was granted and support came. Afterward, more people came to Britain from "the three powers of Germany; the Old Saxons, the Angles, and the Jutes". The Saxons populated Essex, Sussex and Wessex; the Jutes Kent, the Isle of Wight and Hampshire; and the Angles East Anglia, Mercia and Northumbria (leaving their original homeland, Angeln, deserted).

The Anglo-Saxon Chronicle also lists Wihtgar and Stuf as founders of the Wihtwara (Isle of Wight) and a man named Port and his two sons Bieda and Maeglaof as founders of the Meonwara (southern Hampshire). In 686 Bede tells us that Jutish Hampshire extended to the western edge of the New Forest; however, that seems to include another Jutish people, the Ytene, (Note: Ytene is the genitive plural of Yt meaning "Jute", i.e. "of the Jutes".) (Note: Florence of Worcester talks about how William Rufus was slain in the New Forest and that in the English tongue (Nova Foresta que lingua Anglorum) the term for the New Forest was Ytene .) and it is not certain that these two territories formed a continuous coastal block. Towards the end of the Roman occupation of England, raids on the east coast became more intense and the expedient adopted by Romano-British leaders was to enlist the help of mercenaries to whom they ceded territory. It is thought that mercenaries may have started arriving in Sussex as early as the 5th century.

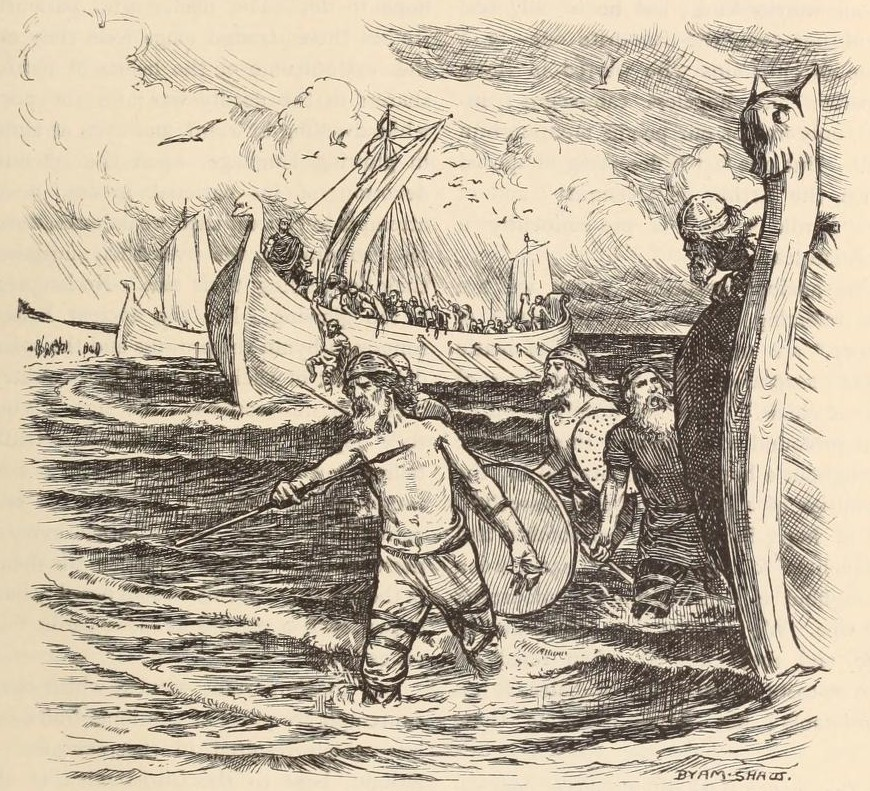
Landing of the Jutes in Britain by Byam Shaw, c. 1898

Before the 7th century, there is a dearth of contemporary written material about the Anglo-Saxons' arrival. (Note: One notable exception is that of Gildas) Most material that does exist was written several hundred years after the events. The earlier dates for the beginnings of settlement, provided by the Anglo-Saxon Chronicle, have been contested by some findings in archaeology. One alternative hypothesis to the foundation legend suggests, because previously inhabited sites on the Frisian and north German coasts had been rendered uninhabitable by flooding (Note: The local population of Friesland were subject to flooding from 500BC onwards. Their response was to build artificial mounds known as terpen. During the 5th century the population in these areas increased, probably due to people migrating to England.), that the migration was due to displacement. Under this alternative hypothesis, the British provided land for the refugees to settle on in return for peaceful coexistence and military cooperation.

Ship construction in the 2nd or 3rd century adopted the use of iron fastenings, instead of the old sewn fastenings, to hold together the plank built boats of the Jutland peninsula. This enabled them to build stronger sea going vessels. Vessels going from Jutland to Britain probably would have sailed along the coastal regions of Lower Saxony and the Netherlands before crossing the English Channel. This was because navigation techniques of the time required the ship to be moored up overnight. Marine archaeology has suggested that migrating ships would have sheltered in various river estuaries on the route. Artefacts and parts of ships, of the period, have been found that support this theory.

It is likely that the Jutes initially inhabited Kent and from there they occupied the Isle of Wight, southern Hampshire and also possibly the area around Hastings in East Sussex (Haestingas). J E A Jolliffe compared agricultural and farming practices across 5th century Sussex to that of 5th century Kent. He suggested that the Kentish system underlaid the 5th century farming practices of Sussex. He hypothesised that Sussex was probably settled by Jutes before the arrival of the Saxons, with Jutish territory stretching from Kent to the New Forest. The north Solent coast had been a trading area since Roman times. The old Roman roads between Sidlesham and Chichester (Note: It is likely that the Chichester to Sidlesham Roman Road extended to Selsey Bill.) and Chichester to Winchester would have provided access to the Jutish settlements in Hampshire. Therefore, it is possible that the German folk arriving in the 5th century that landed in the Selsey area would have been directed north to Southampton Water. From there into the mouth of the Meon valley and would have been allowed to settle near the existing Romano-British people. The Jutish kingdom (Note: Iutarum natio) in Hampshire that Bede describes has various placenames that identify the locations as Jutish. These include Bishopstoke (Ytingstoc) and the Meon Valley (Ytedene).

=== Mercian and South Saxon takeover ===
In Kent, Hlothhere had been ruler since 673/4. He must have come into conflict with Mercia, because in 676 the Mercian king Æthelred invaded Kent and according to Bede:

In the year of our Lord's incarnation 676, when Ethelred, king of the Mercians, ravaged Kent with a powerful army, and profaned churches and monasteries, without regard to religion, or the fear of God, he among the rest destroyed the city of Rochester

— Bede 1910, 1.15

In 681 Wulfhere of Mercia advanced into southern Hampshire and the Isle of Wight. Shortly after he gave the Isle of Wight and Meonwara to Æthelwealh of Sussex.

In Kent, Eadric was for a time co-ruler (Note: There is no certain evidence for Eadric ruling with his uncle. There is a charter where they are both jointly named but it may just have been a conflation of two earlier separate codes) alongside his uncle Hlothhere with a law code being issued in their names. Ultimately, Eadric revolted against his uncle and with help from a South Saxon army in about 685, was able to kill Hlothhere, and replace him as ruler of Kent.

=== West Saxon invasion ===
In the 680s, the Kingdom of Wessex was in the ascendant, the alliance between the South Saxons and the Mercians and their control of southern England, put the West Saxons under pressure. Their king Cædwalla, probably concerned about Mercian and South Saxon influence in Southern England, conquered the land of the South Saxons and took over the Jutish areas in Hampshire and the Isle of Wight. Bede describes how Cædwalla brutally suppressed the South Saxons and attempted to slaughter the Jutes of the Isle of Wight and replace them with people from "his own province", but maintained that he was unable to do so, and Jutes remained a majority on the island. (Note: Some have described this act as "ethnic cleansing". The historian Robin Bush was cited in the BBC Radio 4 "Who were the Jutes". Making History Programme 11 (2008), as being the principal advocate for this assertion.)

After Cædwalla had possessed himself of the kingdom of the Gewissae, he also took the Isle of Wight, which till then was entirely given over to idolatry, and by cruel slaughter endeavoured to destroy all the inhabitants thereof, and to place in their stead people from his own province.

— Bede 1910, 4.16

Cædwalla killed Aruald, the king of the Isle of Wight. Aruald's two younger brothers, who were heirs to the throne, escaped from the island but were hunted down and found at Stoneham, Hampshire. They were killed on Cædwalla's orders. The Isle of Wight was then permanently under West Saxon control and the Meonwara was integrated into Wessex. Cædwalla also invaded Kent and installed his brother Mul as leader. However, it was not long before Mul and twelve others were burnt to death by the Kentishmen. After Cædwalla was superseded by Ine of Wessex, Kent agreed to pay compensation to Wessex for the death of Mul, but they retained their independence.

== Influences and culture ==
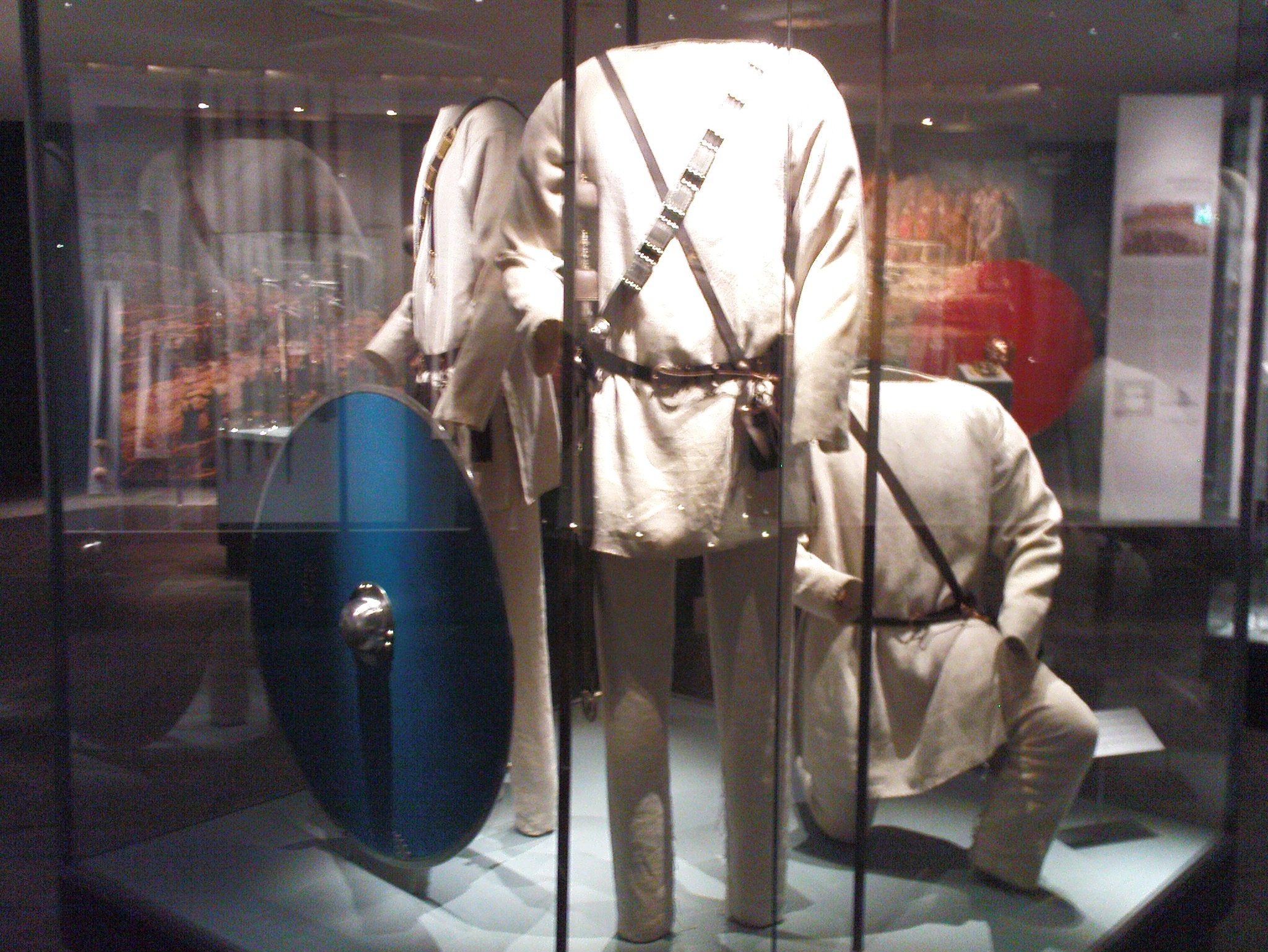
Reconstructions of clothes from Illerup Ådal, Moesgård Museum.

When the Jutish kingdom of Kent was founded, around the middle of the 5th century, Roman ways and influences must have still had a strong presence. The Roman settlement of Durovernum Cantiacorum became Canterbury. The people of Kent were described as Cantawara, a Germanised form of the Latin Cantiaci.

Although not all historians accept Bede's scheme for the settlement of Britain into Anglian, Jutish and Saxon areas as perfectly accurate, the archaeological evidence indicates that the peoples of west Kent were culturally distinct from those in the east of Kent, with west Kent sharing the 'Saxon' characteristics of its neighbours in the southeast of England. Brooches and bracteates found in east Kent, the Isle of Wight and southern Hampshire showed a strong Frankish (Note: Some ancient sources have suggested that the Franks may have had overlordship of Kent at some point.) and North Sea influence from the mid-fifth century to the late sixth century compared to north German styles found elsewhere in Anglo-Saxon England. There is discussion about who crafted the jewellery (found in the archaeological sites of Kent). Suggestions include crafts people who had been trained in the Roman workshops of northern Gaul or the Rhineland. It is also possible that those artisans went on to develop their own individual style. By the late 6th century grave goods indicate that west Kent had adopted the distinctive east Kent material culture.

The Frankish princess Bertha arrived in Kent around 580 to marry the king Æthelberht of Kent. Bertha was already a Christian and had brought a bishop, Liudhard, with her across the Channel. Æthelberht rebuilt an old Romano-British structure and dedicated it to St Martin allowing Bertha to continue practising her Christian faith. In 597 Pope Gregory I sent Augustine to Kent, on a mission to convert the Anglo-Saxons, There are suggestions that Æthelberht had already been baptised when he "courteously received" the pope's mission. Æthelberht was the first of the Anglo-Saxon rulers to be baptised.

The simplified Christian burial was introduced at this time. Christian graves were usually aligned East to West, whereas with some exceptions pagan burial sites were not. The lack of archaeological grave evidence in the land of the Haestingas is seen as supporting the hypothesis that the peoples there would have been Christian Jutes who had migrated from Kent. In contrast to Kent, the Isle of Wight was the last area of Anglo-Saxon England to be evangelised in 686, when Cædwalla of Wessex invaded the island, killing the local king Arwald and his brothers.

The Jutes used a system of partible inheritance known as gavelkind, which was practised in Kent until the 20th century. The custom of gavelkind was also found in other areas of Jutish settlement. (Note: For example, in the area of East Sussex that became the Rape of Hastings and was inhabited by the people known as the Hæstingas.) In England and Wales, gavelkind was abolished by the Administration of Estates Act 1925. Before abolition in 1925, all land in Kent was presumed to be held by gavelkind until the contrary was proved. The popular reason given for the practice remaining so long is due to the "Swanscombe Legend"; according to this, Kent made a deal with William the Conqueror whereby he would allow them to keep local customs in return for peace.

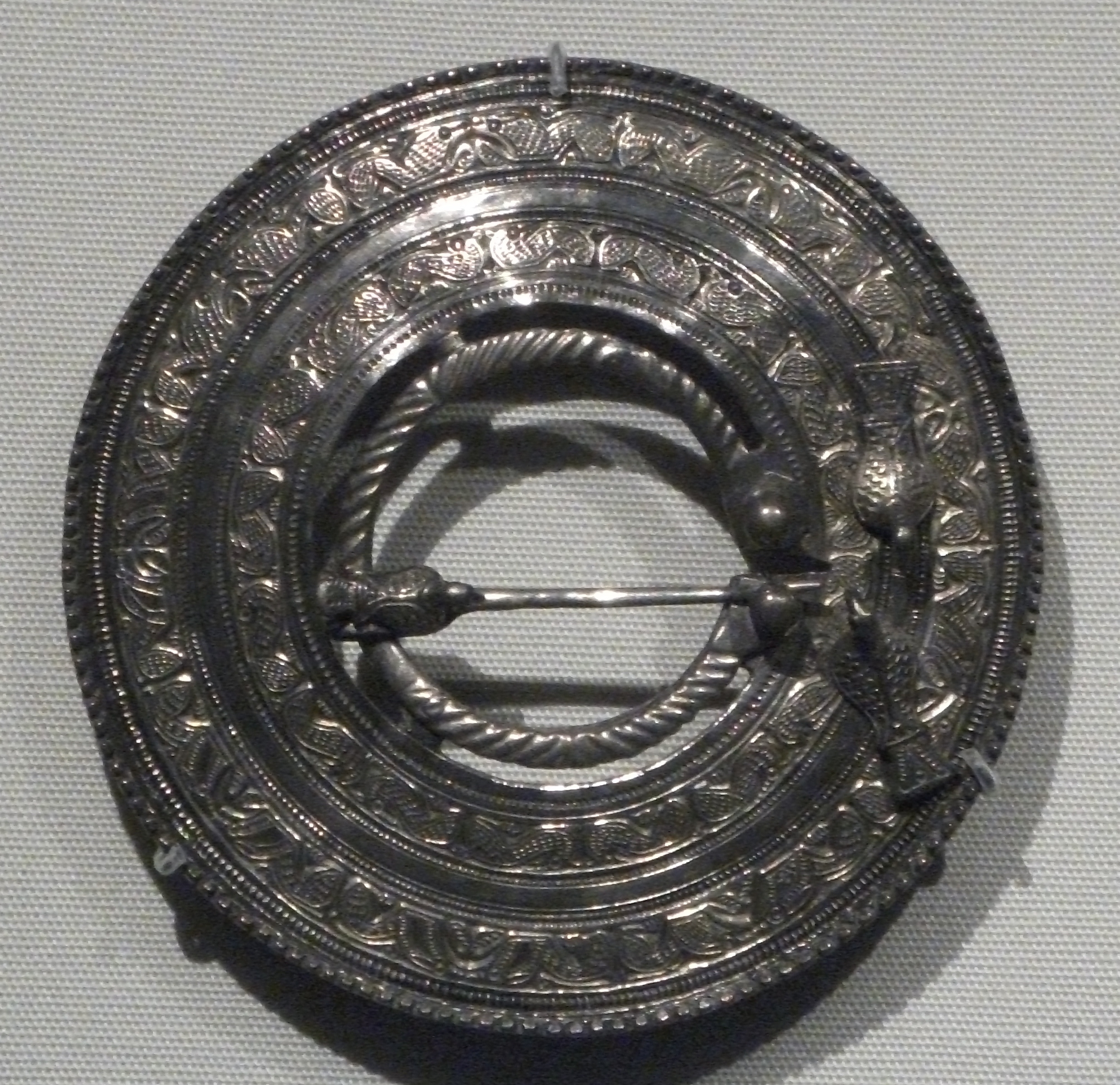
Quoit brooch found in Sarre, Kent. Part of the British Museum collection.

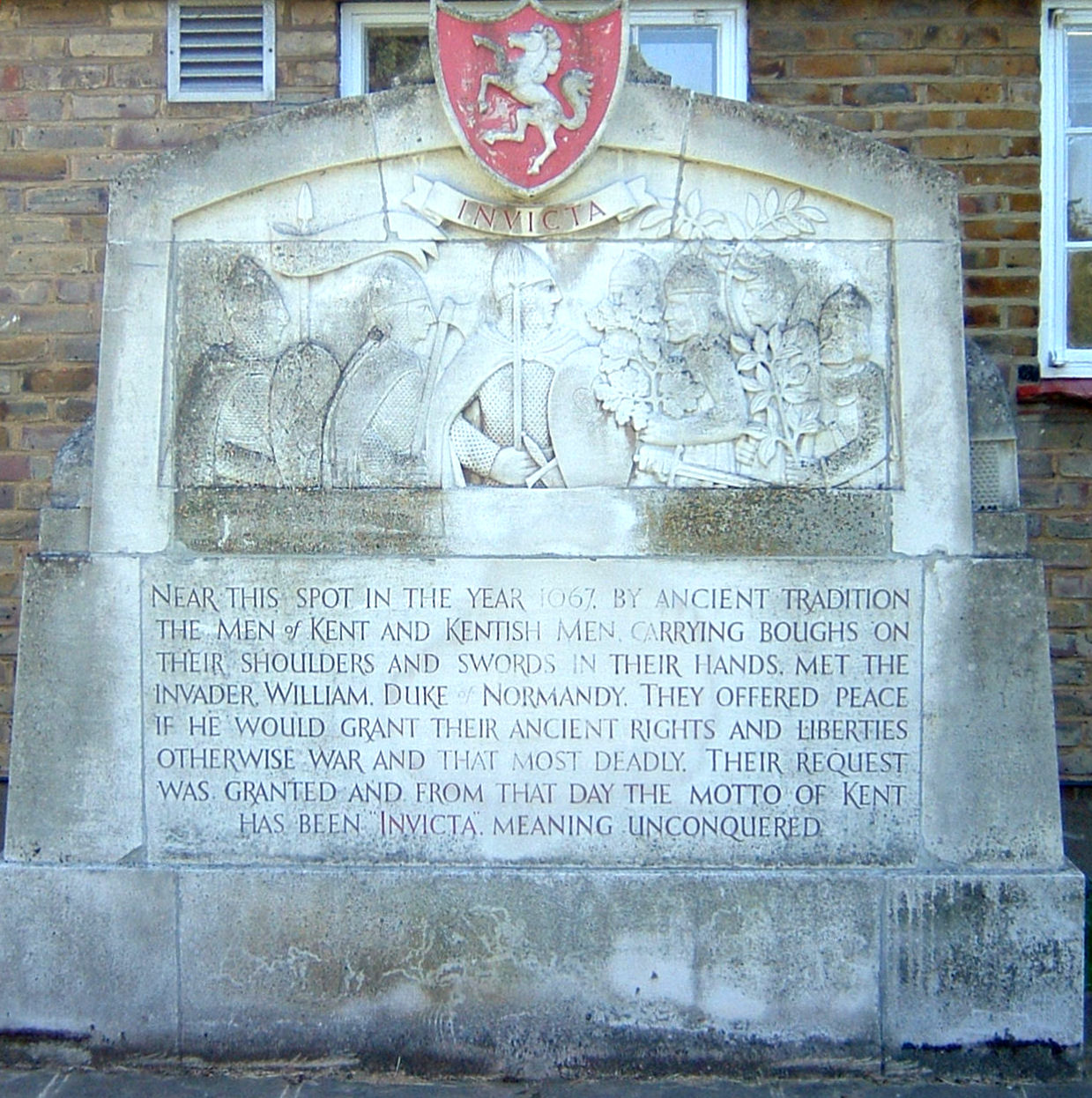
Monument in Swanscombe to Kent's agreement with William the Conqueror.

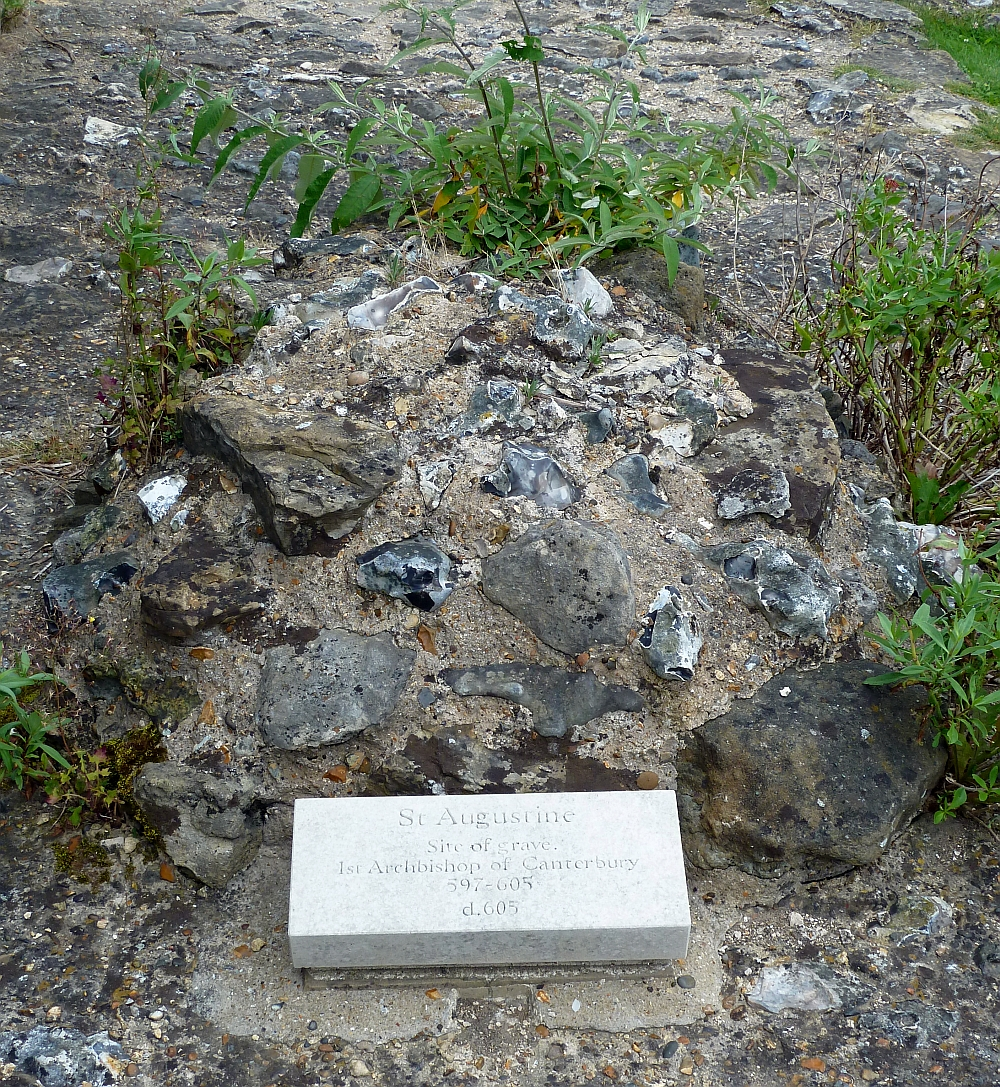
Augustine's grave at St Augustine's Abbey.

== Homeland and historical accounts ==
The early migrations of Germanic peoples from coastal regions of northern Europe to areas of modern-day England. The settlement regions correspond roughly to later dialect divisions of Old English.

Although historians are confident of where the Jutes settled in England, they are divided on where they actually came from. (Note: The historian Barbara Yorke, suggests that the Jutish identity may have originated in England, rather than in a specific, identifiable community in continental Europe.)

The chroniclers, Procopius, Constantius of Lyon, Gildas, Bede, Nennius, and also the Anglo-Saxon Chronicle, Alfred the Great and Asser provide the names of tribes who settled Britain during the mid-fifth century, and in their combined testimony, the four tribes mentioned are the Angli, Saxones, Iutae and Frisii. (Note: English: Angles, Saxons, Jutes, Frisians.)

The Roman historian Tacitus refers to a people called the Eudoses, a tribe who possibly developed into the Jutes.

The Jutes have also been identified with the Eotenas (ēotenas) involved in the Frisian conflict with the Danes as described in the Finnesburg episode in the Old English poem Beowulf. Theudebert, king of the Franks, wrote to the Emperor Justinian and in the letter claimed that he had lordship over a nation called the Saxones Eucii. The Eucii are thought to have been Jutes and may have been the same as a little-documented tribe called the Euthiones. The Euthiones are mentioned in a poem by Venantius Fortunatus (583) as being under the suzerainty of Chilperic I of the Franks. The Euthiones were located somewhere in northern Francia, modern day Flanders, an area of the European mainland opposite to Kent.

Bede inferred that the Jutish homeland was on the Jutland peninsula. However, analysis of grave goods of the time have provided a link between East Kent, south Hampshire and the Isle of Wight, but little evidence of any link with Jutland. There is evidence that the Jutes who migrated to England came from northern Francia or from Frisia. Historians have posited that Jutland was the homeland of the Jutes, but when the Danes invaded the Jutland Peninsula in about AD 200, some of the Jutes would have been absorbed by the Danish culture and others may have migrated to northern Francia and Frisia. In Scandinavian sources from the Middle Ages, the Jutes are only sporadically mentioned, now as subgroup of the Danes.

There is a hypothesis, suggested by Pontus Fahlbeck in 1884, that the Geats were Jutes. According to this hypothesis the Geats resided in southern Sweden and also in Jutland (where Beowulf would have lived). (Note: The hypothesis resulted in a debate that lasted for over 50 years. However, the current consensus is that Fahlbeck was wrong.)

The evidence adduced for this hypothesis includes:

- Primary sources referring to the Geats (Geátas) by alternative names such as Iútan, Iótas, and Eotas.
- Asser in his Life of Alfred (Chapter 2) identifies the Jutes with the Goths (Note: Keynes and Lapidge posited that Asser incorrectly suggested that the Goths were ethnically the same as the Jutes, when in fact they were not. The Anglo-Saxon Chronicle described the Jutes as Iotum or Iutum (dative plural) and Iutna cyn ('people of the Jutes') whereas the Old English translation of Bede’s Ecclesiastical History the Latin Iutis is rendered as Gēatas (or "Geats" – the Scandinavian people to whom Beowulf was said to belong) rather than Ēote "Jutes".) (in a passage claiming that Alfred the Great was descended, through his mother, Osburga, from the ruling dynasty of the Jutish kingdom of Wihtwara, on the Isle of Wight).
- The Gutasaga is a saga that charts the history of Gotland prior to Christianity. It is an appendix to the Guta Lag (Gotland law) written in the thirteenth or fourteenth century. It says that some inhabitants of Gotland left for mainland Europe. Large burial sites attributable to either Goths or Gepids were found in the 19th century near Willenberg, Prussia. (Note: Willenberg became Wielbark in Poland, after 1945.)

However, the tribal names possibly were confused in the above sources in both Beowulf (8th–11th centuries) and Widsith (late 7th – 10th century). The Eoten (in the Finn passage) are clearly distinguished from the Geatas.

The Finnish surname Juutilainen, which comes from the word "juutti", is speculated by some to have had a connection to Jutland or the Jutes.

=== Possible synonymy with the Frisians ===
While there is no definitive proof that the Frisians and Jutes were the same people, there is compelling evidence suggesting that they were either a single group known by different names or closely related tribes with overlapping territories, cultures, and identities. The fluidity of ethnic designations during the Migration Period makes it plausible that the distinction between "Frisians" and "Jutes" was more of a practical simplification by later chroniclers than a strict ethnic separation. In several Old English and early medieval sources, such as the Finnsburg Fragment and the Anglo-Saxon Chronicle, the terms "Frisians" and "Jutes" appear to be used interchangeably. This suggests that, at least from the perspective of the authors of these texts, the two groups were not clearly distinguishable culturally or ethnically.

Moreover, archaeological findings point to strong cultural similarities between the two groups, as burial practices, material goods (such as weapons, pottery, and jewelry), and settlement patterns in Jutland and Frisian territories show remarkable parallels.

In the field of linguistics, the linguist Elmar Seebold argued that the relatively sharp linguistic boundary between Frisian and Dutch is attributable to migrants from Jutland, with the Jutes simultaneously leaving behind a sharp linguistic boundary between West Germanic and North Germanic in Denmark.

Evolution of North Sea Germanic according to Seebold:
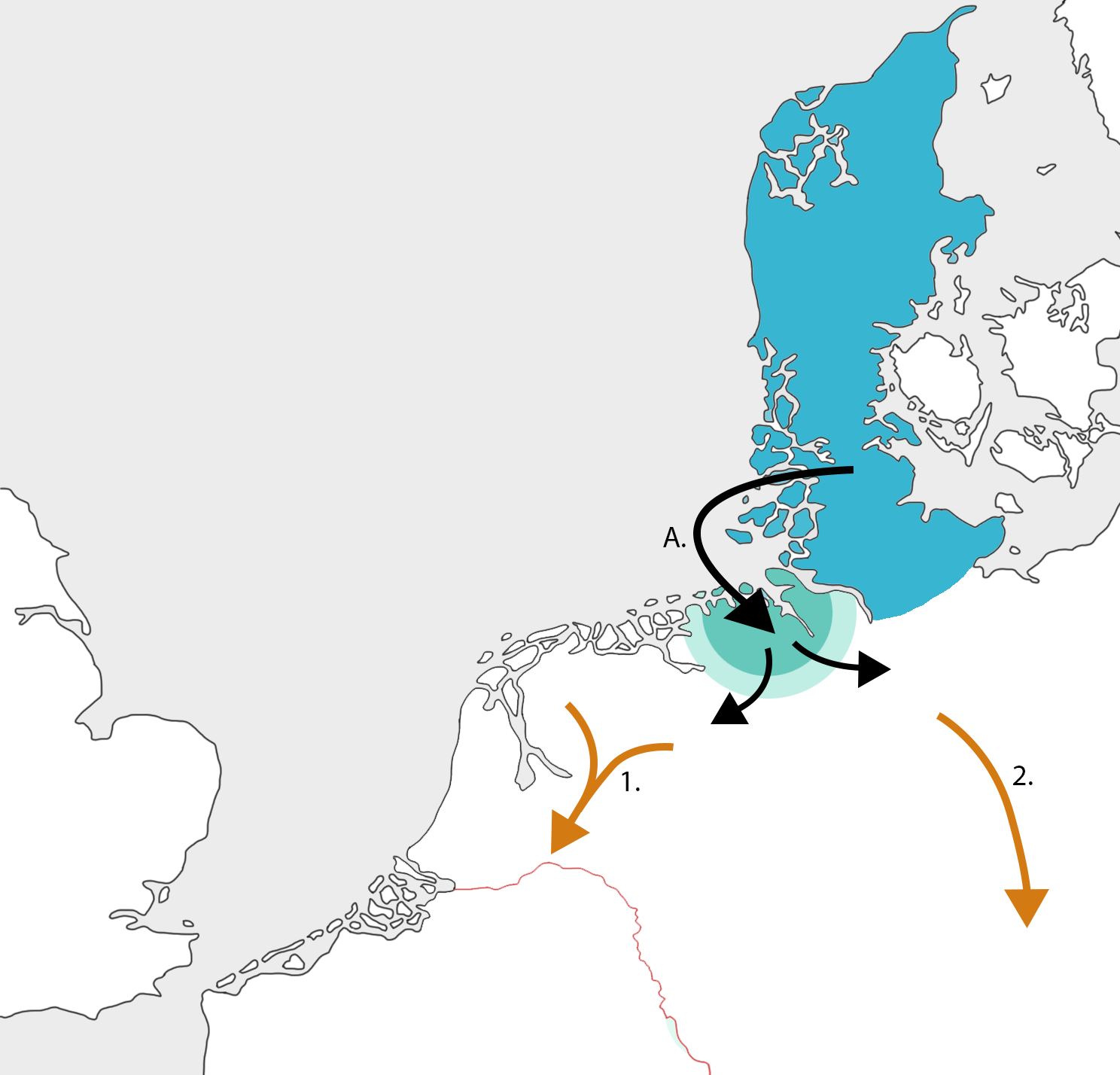
Position of North Sea Germanic dialects before the migration period (3rd century CE).
Migration of the Saxons from the territory of the Angles (A.).
Migration of Weser Rhine Germanic speakers towards the Roman limes (1.), southward migration of Elbe Germanic speakers (2.).

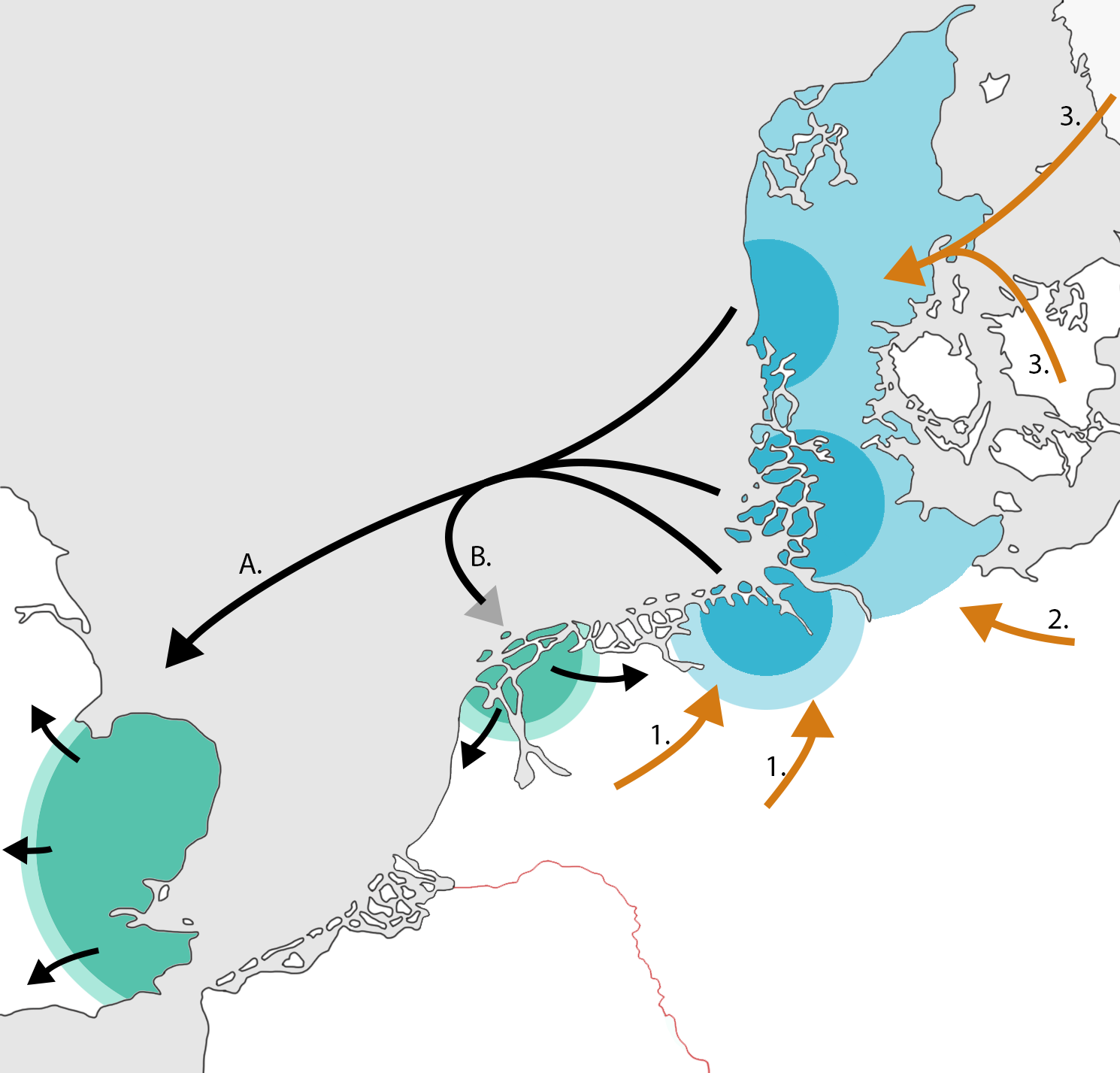
Position of North Sea Germanic dialects during the 5th and 6th century.
Migration of North Sea Germanic speakers (including the Saxon elite) to England (A.) and Frisia (B.)
Migration of Weser Rhine Germanic speakers (1.), migration of West Slavic speakers (2.), migration of North Germanic speakers (3.).

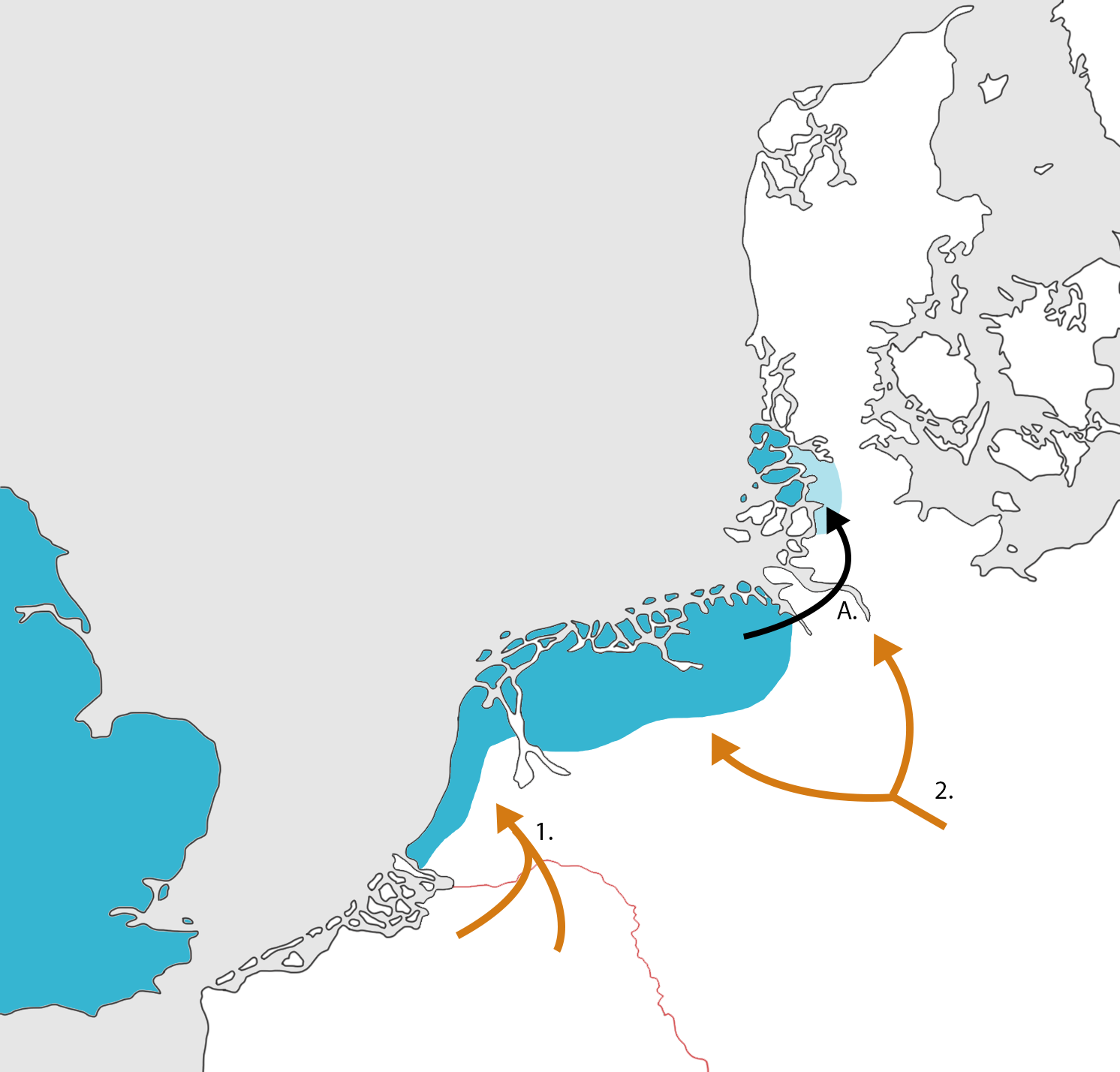
Position of North Sea Germanic dialects (Old English & Old Frisian) directly following the migration period.
Linguistic expansion of Old Frankish (1.) and Old Saxon (2.).
10th/11th century migration of (Ems) Frisian speakers to the North German mainland (A.)

=== Language and writing ===
The runic alphabet is thought to have originated in the Germanic homelands that were in contact with the Roman Empire, and as such was a response to the Latin alphabet. In fact some of the runes emulated their Latin counterpart. The runic alphabet crossed the sea with the Anglo-Saxons and there have been examples, of its use, found in Kent. As the Anglo-Saxon kingdoms were evangelised the script of the Latin alphabet was introduced by Irish Christian missionaries. However, they ran into problems when they were unable to find a Latin equivalent to some of the Anglo-Saxon phonetics. They overcame this by modifying the Latin alphabet to include some runic characters. This became the Old English Latin alphabet. The runic characters were eventually replaced by Latin characters by the end of the 14th century.

Majuscule forms (also called uppercase or capital letters)
A	Æ	B	C	D	Ð	E	F	Ᵹ/G	H	I	L	M	N	O	P	R	S	T	Þ	U	Ƿ/W	X	Y
Minuscule forms (also called lowercase or small letters)
a	æ	b	c	d	ð	e	f	ᵹ/g	h	i	l	m	n	o	p	r	s/ſ	t	þ	u	ƿ/w	x	y

The language that the Anglo-Saxon settlers spoke is known as Old English. There are four main dialectal forms, namely Mercian, Northumbrian, West Saxon and Kentish. Based on Bede's description of where the Jutes settled, Kentish was spoken in what are now the modern-day counties of Kent, Surrey, southern Hampshire and the Isle of Wight. However, historians are divided on what dialect it would have been and where it originated from. The Jutish peninsula has been seen by historians as a pivotal region between the Northern and the Western Germanic dialects. It has not been possible to prove whether Jutish has always been a Scandinavian dialect which later became heavily influenced by West Germanic dialects, or whether Jutland was originally part of the West Germanic dialectal continuum. An analysis of the Kentish dialect by linguists indicates that there was a similarity between Kentish and Frisian. Whether the two can be classed as the same dialect or whether Kentish was a version of Jutish, heavily influenced by Frisian and other dialects, is open to conjecture.
