= Juutilainen =

Juutilainen (pronounced [ˈjuːtilɑi̯nen]) is a Finnish surname. The name mainly comes from the Savonia province, but originally it is from the word "juutti", which refers to the Jutes from Jutland. Notable people with the surname include:

- Antti Juutilainen (1882–1951), Finnish farmer and politician.
- Aarne Juutilainen (1904–1976), army captain
- Ilmari Juutilainen (1914–1999), Air Force fighter pilot
- Pekka Juutilainen (born 1940), Finnish middle-distance runner
- Anssi Juutilainen, (born 1956) Finnish ski-orienteering competitor and world champion
- Virpi Juutilainen (born 1961), Finnish ski-orienteering competitor and world champion
- Jan-Mikael Juutilainen (born 1988), Finnish ice hockey player

== Fictional characters ==
- Eila Ilmatar Juutilainen, a fictional character from the anime/manga series Strike Witches
