= Oldwoodhouselee Castle =

Coordinates: 55.8416°N 3.1876°W

Old Woodhouselee Castle was a 16th-century tower house located approximately 1.5 miles (2.4 km) northeast of Penicuik, Midlothian, Scotland. It was situated south of the River Esk, near a dismantled railway track.

== History ==
It is suggested that Old Woodhouselee Castle was built by Oliver Sinclair in the first half of the 16th century, though Historic Environment Scotland dates it more broadly to the 16th or early 17th century. The property belonged to the Hamiltons of Bothwellhaugh. According to reports, Regent Moray expelled Lady Hamilton and her young from the castle, leaving them naked; the child subsequently died, and Lady Hamilton reportedly went mad. Her husband, James Hamilton of Bothwellhaugh and Woodhouselee, later assassinated Regent Moray at Linlithgow in 1570. The castle was demolished in the late 17th century, with its materials used to construct Woodhouselee, a building that has since also disappeared.

== Structure ==
The castle was situated on a high rock. Today, only three cellars and a ruined wing of an L-plan tower remain. The surviving structure measures 63.5 feet (19.4 m) in length, 20.75 feet (6.32 m) in width, and 8.75 feet (2.67 m) in height. A small structure at the site is believed to have served as a kitchen.

== Tradition ==
According to legend, the ghost of Lady Hamilton, dressed in white and constantly looking for her missing child, haunts the ruins of Old Woodhouselee Castle.

== See also ==
- Castles in Great Britain and Ireland
- List of castles in Scotland
