= Woodhouselee =

Coordinates: 55.84°N 3.19°W

Woodhouselee is an estate in Midlothian in the parish of Glencorse, United Kingdom. It has been owned by gentry including William Tytler and Alexander Fraser Tytler. There is a mansion, now called Firth House, and the ruined 16th-century castle of Old Woodhouselee which was owned by James Hamilton, who assassinated the Regent of Scotland – the first recorded assassination with a firearm.
