= Haplogroup I-BY316 / I-Y7626 =

Human Y-chromosome DNA haplogroup

Haplogroup I-BY316, also known as I-Y7626 or I1a3a1a2a1b1 per the International Society of Genetic Genealogy ('ISOGG), is a Y chromosome haplogroup. It is correlated with a DYF406S1 value of 8 and a DYS617 value of 12.

I-BY316 may be classed as a Nordic haplogroup and it is most common in Finland. Its progenitor is assumed to have lived in Fennoscandia at around 300 BC.

== Origins ==
On the basis of analysing samples of volunteers in YDNA sequencing, the YDNA analysis company YFull estimated that I-BY316 formed 2,300 years ago (500 BC) (95% CI 3,100 <-> 1,950 ybp) with a TMRCA (Time to Most Recent Common Ancestor) of 2,400 years (95% CI 2,800 <-> 2,100 ybp) before present.

Geographically I-BY316 is believed to have arisen in or near what is now Finland (based in part on the current distribution of this haplogroup).The current distribution of I-BY316 shows that there is a very high concentration in the regions bordering the Baltic Sea. Due to the distinct distribution pattern around the Baltic sea it would appear that the progenitor of I-BY316 may have been immersed in a seafaring culture. In a historical context the distribution patterns fits well with the historical region of Kvenland and the associated tribe of the Kvens.

At the time when haplogroup I-BY316 came into existence, the Celts were beginning to expand from their traditional territory in southern Germany. The Germanic peoples were then presumed to be occupying a possible original homeland in southern Sweden and the Jutland peninsula (i.e. the presumed homeland of parent haplogroup I-Z63). There were surrounded on three sides by Kvens. They appear to have gone through a period in which they were conquered by the western Celts and remained subject to them (especially in Jutland). Triggered by the Gallic invasion, the Germanic peoples began expanding south-westwards along the North Sea coast and eastwards along the shores of the Baltic Sea. The push eastward along the Baltic Sea deep into Kven territory is assumed to coincide with the migration pattern of I-BY316. Historical records from the time of haplogroup origin are extremely sparse. The mythological king Fornjót of the Orkneyinga saga was said to have ruled over Kvenland roughly around the time of haplogroup origin. Interestingly some academic sources transcribe the name Fornjót as "the old Jute" which is significant because of the suspected origin of parent haplogroup I-Z63 in Jutland. Fornjót was eventually followed by the dynasty of "sea kings" starting with Heiti Gorsson. Even though mythology may be very far removed from historical truth, it nevertheless paints a picture of a strong seafaring tradition in the area of interest and can therefore help to explain the subsequent expansion of the haplogroup. The Rök Runestone, located in Sweden, includes a passage mentioning "Þjóðríkr the bold, chief of sea-warriors, ruled over the shores of the Hreiðsea.". This likely refers to Theodoric the Great, the Ostrogothic king, and his rule over parts of Italy and the Mediterranean. The inscription connects Theodoric to the "Hreiðsea," which is believed to be the Mediterranean Sea. The stone also mentions him sitting armed on his "Gothic horse" and being a protector of the Mærings, further tying him to Gothic identity. Hence there is a link between the sea kings of Norse saga and the Ostrogothic kings of Italy, whereby in genetic terms the Goths of Italy have had a particularly strong archeogenetic association with I-BY316.

== Archeological Record ==
The earliest archeological sample of I-BY316 is CGG106524 at the Hestehavens Mose site near Hjørring in Denmark whereby C14 dating revealed the sample to be approximately 2,275 years old. The haplogroup was determined as I1a3a1a2a1b1a (PH3482/Y7627). The PH3482 haplogroup is estimated to have formed 2,800 ybp by YFull and as 700 BCE by FamilyTreeDNA.

I-BY316/I-Y7626 was also found in a late 6th Century cemetery in Collegno, Italy, near the city of Torino. The Collegno burial site is associated with Gothic and Lombard remains and dated to the late 6th Century. The remains of sample CL63 belong to subclade I-FT104588. Sample CL63 was also remarkable from an autosomal point of view because CL63 was an individual of predominant central/northern ancestry who did not genetically belong to the major kindred unit. This discovery adds another historical connection of I-Z63 to the Gothic migrations of the early Medieval Period.

Another archeological sample is sample Zeytinliada 14832 which is possibly tied to the Kievan Rus. It belongs to an 25 to 35 year old adult who lived between 600 and 1000 CE during the Medieval Age and was found in the region now known as Zeytinliada, Erdek, Turkey. The genetic profile of this individual does not resemble northern Europeans, so he might be the descendant of a northern European (e.g. part of the Varangian guard of Byzantium) who intermarried with the local population, although a more proximal origin is also possible, as this lineage was found also in Langobards from Hungary. The Rus' provided the earliest members of the Varangian Guard. They were in Byzantine service from as early as 874.

New data from an unpublished study out of Stockholm University: "Beyond the Binary? A Multi-Method Approach to Sexing Children at the Viking Age Site of Ihre, Gotland" references 6 Viking Age samples of haplogroup I-BY316 from the Swedish island of Gotland in the Baltic Sea. All of them belong to branch I-FT140572 (formed c. 350 BCE), joining 2 testers with ancestry from the UK and Slovenia. Per FamilyTree DNA's preliminary analysis, 5 of the samples can be used to create a new branch, I-FTJ74, sharing 2 SNPs. The 6th sample lacks coverage for the novel mutations.

== Distribution ==
Based on the public YDNA database FTDNA in December 2019 the I-BY316 haplogroup is showing the following distribution:

Distribution by Country
Country	Percentage
Finland	22.86%
Germany	14.29%
Sweden	8.57%
Ukraine	5.71%
England	5.71%
Estonia	5.71%
Russian Federation	5.71%
Poland	5.71%
Bosnia and Herzegovina	5.71%
Slovenia	5.71%
Iceland	2.86%
Norway	2.86%
Albania	2.86%
Hungary	2.86%
France	2.86%

The breakdown by countries as above can be condensed into regions:

Distribution by Regions
Country	Percentage
Scandinavia/Baltics	42.85%
Eastern Europe	34.27%
Western Europe	22.86%
