= Wihtwara =

Jutish kingdom within Anglo-Saxon Britain on the Isle of Wight

- 534-686
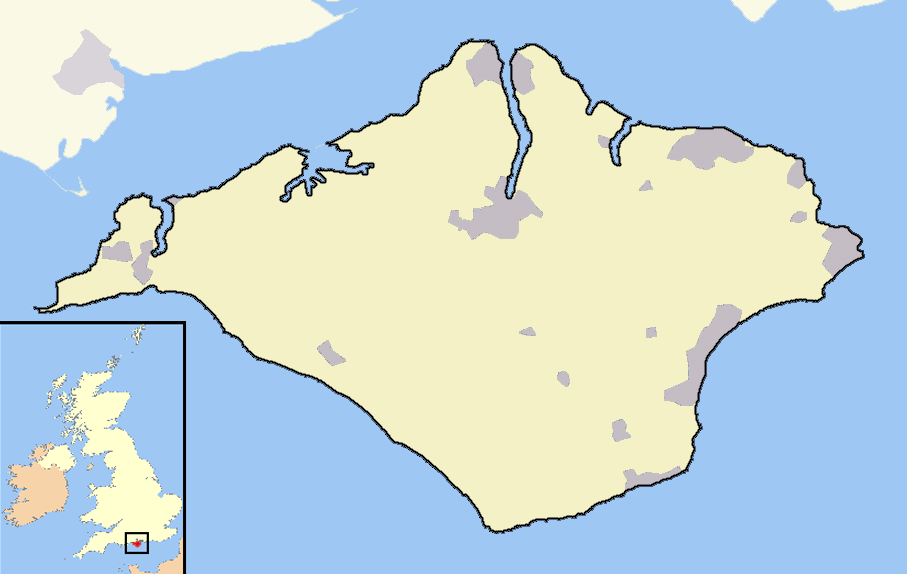
- The location of the Isle of Wight within the United Kingdom
- Religion: Anglo-Saxon paganism, Anglo-Saxon Christianity
- Government: Monarchy
  - 534–544: Wihtgar (first; possibly legendary)
  - ?–686: Arwald (last)
Preceded by	Succeeded by
Sub-Roman Britain	Lordship of the Isle of Wight
- Today part of: United Kingdom; England; South East England; Isle of Wight

Wihtwara (Old English: Wihtware or Wihtsætan) were the Early Medieval inhabitants of the Isle of Wight, a 147-square-mile (380 km^{2}) island off the south coast of England. Writers such as Bede attribute their origin to Jutes who migrated to the island during the Anglo-Saxon settlement of Britain. They formed an independent kingdom at points in the Early Middle Ages, with their last king Arwald dying as the last heathen Anglo-Saxon king. After this point, the island became a part of Wessex and later England.

== Name ==
The term Wihtware translates from Old English as "the people of the Isle of Wight", with the suffix -ware denoting a people group, as in Cantware ("the people of Kent"). In the Old English translation of Bede's work, the term Wihtsætan is used instead, possibly as it was the more common name by which the group was known at the time of writing. It has been suggested that the suffixes -sæta and -ware may have had a slight semantic difference, with the latter being used more for political purposes and in reference to groups with a fixed location. Consequently, the loss of political independence of the Wihtware may have led to a change over time in name. Other synonyms include Latin: Uictuarii and possibly Wihtgara, a group mentioned in the Tribal Hidage as having 800 hides of land.

== Early Middle Ages ==
=== Founding ===
Bede in his Ecclesiastical History of the English People writes that the Jutes settled Wight as part of the Anglo-Saxon settlement of Britain, along with the part of Great Britain opposite the island, and Kent. While his accounts reflect later geopolitics and have limited historical accuracy, a 'Jutish' material culture has been identified in these regions. Similarities in culture and genetics further support the migration of people at this time to Britain from continental northern Europe such as modern day Denmark and northern Germany.

Asser's biography of Alfred the Great lists Wihtgar and Stuf as the two earliest kings of Wight and nephews of Cerdic, founder of the Kingdom of Wessex, making them ancestors of Alfred the Great's mother Osburh. The account further describes how Wihtgar and Stuf were of Jutish and Gothic origin and set about exterminating the island's native Briton inhabitants, either killing them or driving them into exile. The Anglo-Saxon Chronicle gives a similar account in which Wihtgar and Stuf were kinsmen of Cerdic; Wihtgar and Stuf received the island from Cerdic's son Cynric in 534, with the death of Wihtgar taking place in 544. Scholars have suggested that Wihtgar may have been fictitious: that is, the central figure of a founding myth invented retrospectively, to justify the name of the island, with Wiht deriving from the Latin name of the island, Vecta.

=== Conquest and Annexation ===
According to the Anglo-Saxon Chronicle, in 661 Wulfhere of Mercia conquered the Isle of Wight and gave the overlordship to his godson, King Æthelwealh of Sussex, to convert the islanders to Christianity. Bede, however, records that the island was converted after an invasion in 686 by King Cædwalla of Wessex, which the Anglo-Saxon Chronicle states was conducted together with his brother Mul of Kent. The final Jutish king of the Wihtwara, Arwald, was purportedly killed while resisting Cædwalla. Arwald's two younger brothers, after attempting to escape Cædwalla, were captured, baptised, then executed by him.

== Later Middle Ages ==
After the Norman Conquest the Isle of Wight was given to the de Redvers family in 1101 who were known as "Lords of the Isle of Wight". However the last of them was Izabel de Forz (also known as Isabella de Fortibus; 1237–1293), who was known informally as the "Queen of the Isle of Wight". Forz was visited shortly before her death by King Edward Longshanks (known later as Edward I), who said later that she had sold the Isle of Wight to him for 6,000 marks. The village of Queens Bower is said to be named after her.

In 1444, Henry Beauchamp, Duke of Warwick a favourite of King Henry VI was given the title (or perhaps nickname) of King of the Isle of Wight. Beauchamp died shortly afterwards and the title was not used again. The closest existing title at that time - the Lordship of the Isle of Wight - was held by the uncle of King Henry VI, Humphrey, Duke of Gloucester, after being bestowed it in 1434.

== See also ==
- Heptarchy

== Bibliography ==
=== Primary ===
- Bede (1910). Lionel C. Jane (ed.). Ecclesiastical History of the English Nation . Vol. IV.16. Translated by John Stevens – via Wikisource.
- Swanton, Michael, ed. (2000). The Anglo-Saxon Chronicles (2nd ed.). Orion Publishing Group. pp. 14–17.
- Asser (1906) [893]. Life of King Alfred. Translated by Cook, Albert. Ginn & Company.
- Eddius Stephanus Vita Dunstani

=== Secondary ===
- Baker, John; Brookes, Stuart (2013). Beyond the Burghal Hidage: Anglo-Saxon Civil Defence in the Viking Age. Brill. ISBN 978-90-04-24605-8.
- Gretzinger, Joscha; Sayer, Duncan; Justeau, Pierre; Altena, Eveline; Pala, Maria; et al. (October 2022). "The Anglo-Saxon migration and the formation of the early English gene pool". Nature. 610 (7930): 112–119. Bibcode:2022Natur.610..112G. doi:10.1038/s41586-022-05247-2. ISSN 1476-4687. PMC 9534755. PMID 36131019.
- Higham, Nicholas John; Ryan, Martin J. (2013). The Anglo-Saxon world. New Haven: Yale University Press. ISBN 9780300125344.
- Kökeritz, Helge (1943). "Wihtgaraburh". Modern Language Notes. 58 (3): 181–191. doi:10.2307/2910271. ISSN 0149-6611. JSTOR 2910271.
- Venning, Timothy (2013). The Kings & Queens of Anglo-Saxon England. Amberley Publishing.
- Bosworth, Joseph (2014a). "Cant-ware". An Anglo-Saxon Dictionary Online. Faculty of Arts, Charles University.
- Bosworth, Joseph (2014b). "Wiht-ware". An Anglo-Saxon Dictionary Online. Faculty of Arts, Charles University.
- "GLOUCESTER, Humphrey duke of (Protector of England)". www.archontology.org.
- "Dictionary of National Biography". New York Macmillan.
- Yorke, Barbara (23 September 2004a). "Osburh [Osburga]". Oxford Dictionary of National Biography. Oxford University Press. doi:10.1093/ref:odnb/20887.
- Yorke, Barbara (23 September 2004b). "Wihtgar (d. 544?), king of Wight.". Oxford Dictionary of National Biography. Oxford University Press. doi:10.1093/ref:odnb/29380.
- Chisholm, Hugh, ed. (1911). "Warwick, Earls of" . Encyclopædia Britannica. Vol. 28 (11th ed.). Cambridge University Press.
- Henry Beauchamp
