= Andrzej Buko =

Polish medieval archaeologist

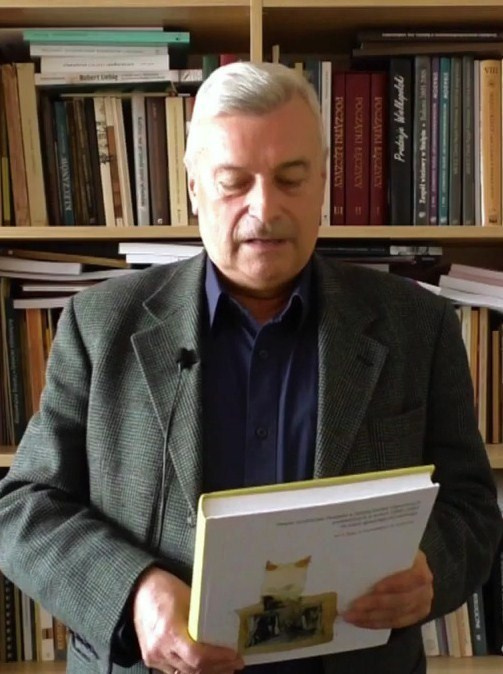
Prof. Andrzej Buko

Andrzej Buko (born 4 August 1947 in Plonsk) is a Polish medieval archaeologist and professor at the University of Warsaw. Since 2007 he has been the director of the Institute of Archaeology and Ethnology of the Polish Academy of Sciences.

== Selected publications ==
- Wczesnośredniowieczna ceramika sandomierska, Ossolineum, (Wrocław 1981)
- (wraz z S. Tabaczyńskim) Sandomierz. Starożytność – wczesne średniowiecze, KAW, (Rzeszów 1981)
- Ceramika wczesnopolska. Wprowadzenie do badań, Ossolineum, (Wrocław 1990)
- "Kleczanów. Badania 1989-1992 (red. i współaut.), Scientia (Warszawa 1997)
- "Początki Sandomierza", Letter Quality (Warszawa 1998)
- Archeologia Polski wczesnośredniowiecznej. Odkrycia-hipotezy-interpretacje TRIO, wyd. I (Warszawa 2005), wyd. II (poprawione i uzupełnione), (2006), wyd. III (poszerzone) 2011
- "The Archaeology of Early Medieval Poland. Discoveries-Hypotheses-Interpretations, Brill, (Leiden-Boston 2008)
- "Stołpie. Tajemnice kamiennej wieży", Letter Quality (Warszawa 2009)
- "Zespół wieżowy w Stołpiu". Badania 2003-2005, (red. i współaut.) Letter Quality, Warszawa 2009
- "Early Medieval Archaeology in Poland: the beginnings and development stages" in European Journal of Post-Classical Archaeologies, Vol. 2, 2012.
