= Marquess of Hamilton =

The title of Marquess of Hamilton has been created twice in British history.

- For the creation of 1599, see Duke of Hamilton
- For the creation of 1868, see Duke of Abercorn
