= Arwald =

Last king of the Isle of Wight

Arwald (Note: This name may have been "Aruald", "Arwald" or "Atwald" – Bede's script is often difficult to read. PASE has "Arwald") (died 686) was the last pagan Anglo-Saxon king and the last king of the Wihtwara, a people that inhabited the Isle of Wight. He was killed by Cædwalla of Wessex during an invasion of his kingdom, at which point the island was Christianised. During the invasion, his two brothers were baptised before also being killed and are now venerated as saints.

== Invasion of Wihtwara ==
According to Anglo-Saxon Chronicle A, Wihtwara was invaded by Cædwalla of Wessex in 686 during the rule of Arwald. Bede's Ecclesiastical History of the English People states that at the time of this the island's whole population was heathen and the invader sought to slaughter every inhabitant of Wihtwara without mercy and to populate the island afresh with West Saxons. He also promised that if he was successful in conquering the island, he would give a fourth of it to the Church.

Arwald was killed during the West Saxon invasion, and his two younger brothers fled to mainland Britain where they were betrayed by those there and captured by Cædwalla's forces. It is unclear how old the brothers were at this time but the use of puer to describe them suggests an age around 7–14. Cædwalla, who had been wounded during the fighting, ordered them to be executed but Cynibert, a bishop from Hreutford, convinced him to have the boys baptised first. Bede records that these were the first from the island were "saved". He then writes that when "the executioner came, they joyfully underwent the temporal death, through which they did not doubt they were to pass to the life of the soul, which is everlasting" and that Christianity was then imposed on Wight. (Note: The original text in Latin is as follows: "Moxque illi instante carnifice mortem laeti subiere temporalem, per quam se ad uitam animae perpetuam non dubitabant esse transituros") After taking control of Wight, he upheld his former oath, giving large estates to Wilfrid and from this point onwards, the inhabitants were under West Saxon domination, being administered in Church matters by the bishop of Winchester by 731.

Bede describes Arwald's brothers as "among the first fruits of the island who believed". They are now venerated as saints, however as their names are unknown they are called collectively "St. Arwald" after their brother. Their feast day is 22 April. It has been suggested that the brothers were depicted by Bede as willingly being killed and receiving a heavenly reward in order to appease those who sympathised with Arwald's family, which had no recorded survivors of the conquest.

== Modern influence ==
Arwald is portrayed as the pagan antagonist to the Christian Caedwalla in the fiction book Caedwalla by Frank Cowper (1888).

== Bibliography ==
=== Primary ===
- Bede: Book IV.
- Sellar (1907). Bede's Ecclesiastical History of England - Christian Classics Ethereal Library. London: George Bell and Sons.
- Eddius Stephanus, Vita Wilfridi

=== Secondary ===
- Kirby, David Peter (2000). The earliest English kings (Rev. ed.). London; New York: Routledge. ISBN 9780415242110.
- Lemke, Andreas (1 March 2018). "6. Children and the Conversion of the Anglo-Saxons in Bede's Historia ecclesiastica gentis Anglorum". Childhood & Adolescence in Anglo-Saxon Literary Culture. University of Toronto Press. pp. 120–138. doi:10.3138/9781487514433-009. ISBN 978-1-4875-1443-3.
- Yorke, Barbara (1997). Wessex in the Early Middle Ages. London: Routledge. ISBN 0-415-16639-X.
