= Territorial evolution of Poland =

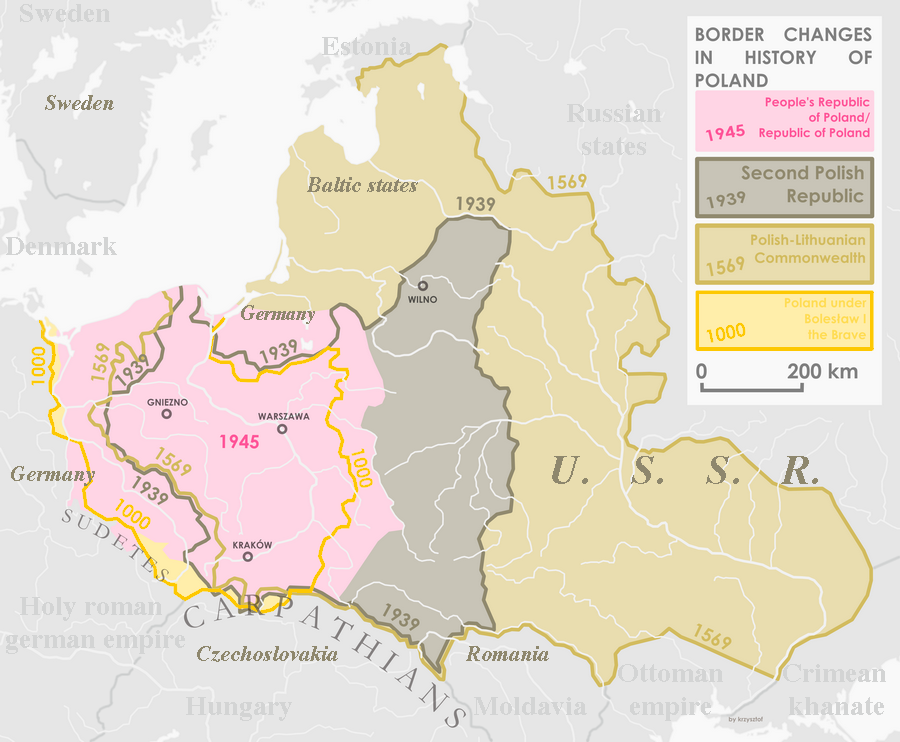
Borders of Polish states (1000, 1939, 1945) and Polish–Lithuanian Commonwealth (union state of the Crown of the Kingdom of Poland and Grand Duchy of Lithuania since 1569)

Poland is a country in Central Europe bordered by Germany to the west; the Czech Republic and Slovakia to the south; Ukraine, Belarus, and Lithuania to the east; and the Baltic Sea and Kaliningrad Oblast, a Russian exclave, to the north. The total area of Poland is 312,679 square kilometres (120,726 sq mi), making it the 69th largest country in the world and the ninth largest in Europe.

From a nucleus between the Oder and Vistula rivers on the North-Central European Plain, Poland has at its largest extent expanded as far as the Baltic, the Dnieper and the Carpathians, while in periods of weakness it has shrunk drastically and even ceased to exist.

== Territorial history ==
In 1492, the territory of Poland-Lithuania – not counting the fiefs of Mazovia, Moldavia, and Prussia – covered 1,115,000 km^{2} (431,000 sq mi), making it the largest territory in Europe; by 1793, it had fallen to 215,000 km^{2} (83,000 sq mi), the same size as Great Britain, and in 1795, it disappeared completely. The first 20th-century incarnation of Poland, the Second Polish Republic, occupied 389,720 km^{2} (150,470 sq mi), while, since 1945, a more westerly Poland covers 312,677 km^{2} (120,725 sq mi).

The Poles are the most numerous of the West Slavs and occupy what some believe to be the original homeland of the Slavic peoples. While other groups migrated, the Polanie remained in situ along the Vistula, from the river's sources to its estuary at the Baltic Sea. There is no other European nation centred to such an extent on one river. The establishment of a Polish state is often identified with the adoption of Christianity by Mieszko I in 966 CE (see Baptism of Poland), when the state covered territory similar to that of present-day Poland. In 1025 CE, Poland became a kingdom. In 1569, Poland cemented a long association with the Grand Duchy of Lithuania by signing the Union of Lublin, forming the Polish–Lithuanian Commonwealth to become one of the largest and most populous countries in 16th- and 17th-century Europe.

Territorial changes of Polish states and Polish–Lithuanian Commonwealth (union state of the Crown of the Kingdom of Poland and Grand Duchy of Lithuania since 1569) between 1635-2009

The Polish–Lithuanian Commonwealth had many characteristics that made it unique among states of that era. The Commonwealth's political system, often called the Noble's Democracy or Golden Freedom, was characterized by the sovereign's power being reduced by laws and the legislature (Sejm), which was controlled by the nobility (szlachta). This system was a precursor to the modern concepts of broader democracy and constitutional monarchy. The two comprising states of the Commonwealth were formally equal, although in reality Poland was the dominant partner in the union. Its population was hallmarked by a high level of ethnic and confessional diversity, and the state was noted for having religious tolerance unusual for its age, although the degree of tolerance varied over time.

In the late 18th century, the Polish–Lithuanian Commonwealth began to collapse. Its neighbouring states were able to slowly dismember the Commonwealth. In 1795, Poland's territory was completely partitioned among the Kingdom of Prussia, the Russian Empire, and Austria. Poland regained its independence as the Second Polish Republic in 1918 after World War I, but lost it in World War II through occupation by Nazi Germany and the Soviet Union. Poland lost over six million citizens in World War II, emerging several years later as the socialist People's Republic of Poland within the Eastern Bloc, under strong Soviet influence.

During the Revolutions of 1989, communist rule was overthrown and Poland became what is constitutionally known as the "Third Polish Republic." Poland is a unitary state made up of sixteen voivodeships (Polish: województwo). Poland is a member of the European Union, NATO, and the Organisation for Economic Co-operation and Development (OECD).

Poland currently has a population of over 38 million people, which makes it the 34th most populous country in the world and one of the most populous members of the European Union.

== Territorial timeline ==
In the period following the emergence of Poland in the 10th century, the Polish nation was led by a series of rulers of the Piast dynasty, who converted the Poles to Christianity, created a sizeable Central European state, and integrated Poland into European culture. Formidable foreign enemies and internal fragmentation eroded this initial structure in the 13th century, but consolidation in the 14th century laid the base for the Polish Kingdom.

Beginning with the Lithuanian Grand Duke Jogaila, the Jagiellon dynasty (1385–1569) ruled the Polish–Lithuanian union. The Lublin Union of 1569 established the Polish–Lithuanian Commonwealth as an influential player in European politics and a vital cultural entity.

== Duchy and Kingdom of Poland until 1385 ==
Territorial changes before and during the Kingdom of Poland (1025–1385), ending with the Union of Krewo.

=== 960–992 ===
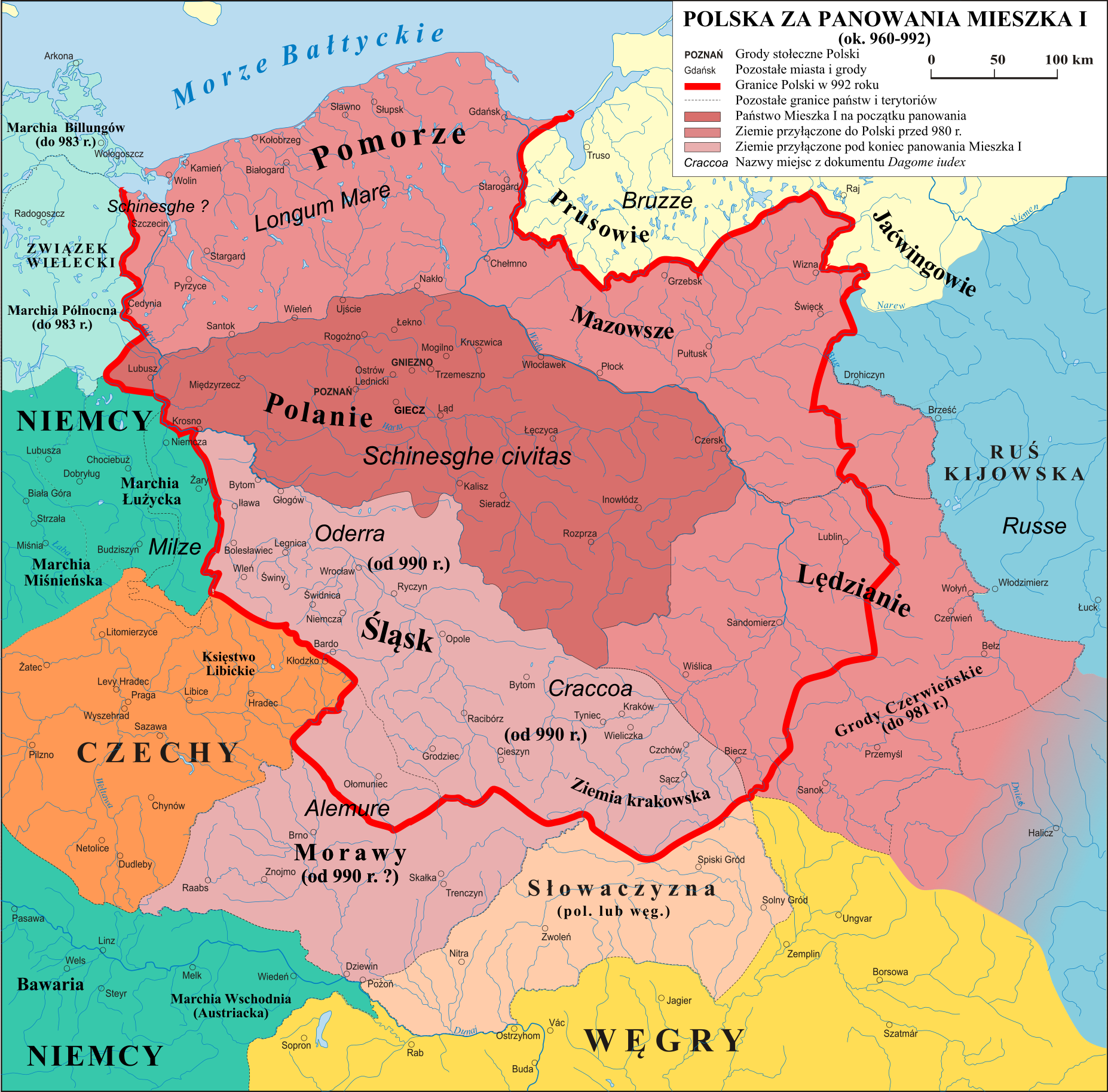
Poland (dark pink) and conquests under Mieszko's rule (ca. 960–992)

Mieszko I of Poland was the first historical ruler of the first independent Polish state ever recorded; the Duchy of Poland. He was responsible for the introduction and subsequent spread of Christianity in Poland. During his long reign most of the territories inhabited by Polish tribes were added to his territory into a single Polish state. By c. 967 he included Pomerania up to the Oder estuary and Wolin island in the west. The 10th-century western border of Poland in the Pomeranian section was probably based on the Rędowa River, i.e. further west than today. In 981 he lost the Czerwień Cities in the south-east, tribal territory of the Lendians, to the Kyivan Rus'. The last of his conquests were Silesia and south-western Lesser Poland that were incorporated some time before 990.

=== 1002–1025 ===
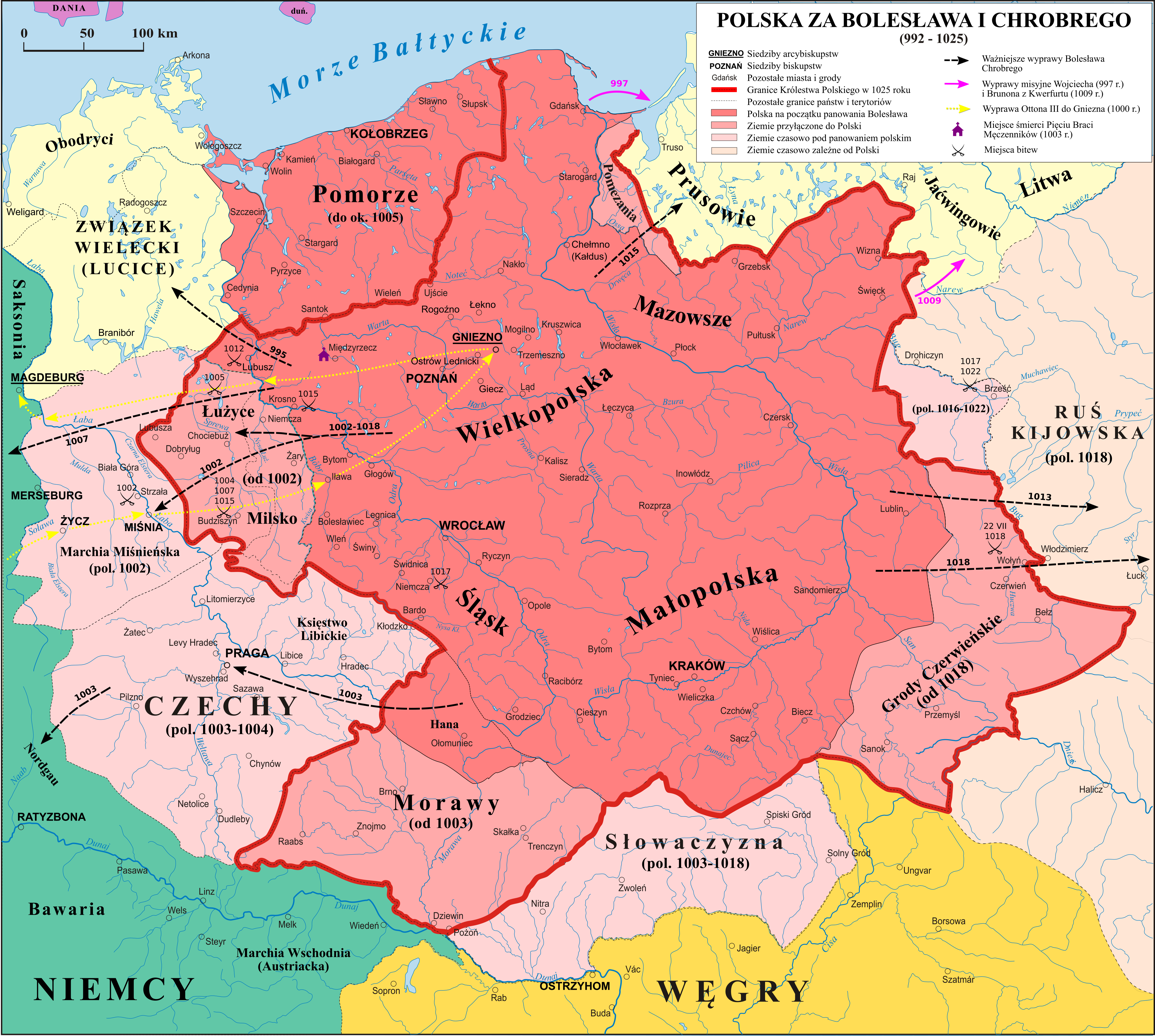
Poland during the reign of Bolesław the Brave

During the reign of Bolesław the Brave, relations between Poland and the Holy Roman Empire deteriorated, resulting in a series of wars (1002–1005, 1007–1013, 1015–1018). Poland took control of the Lusatia region in the south-west, and briefly Miśnia. From 1003 to 1004 Bolesław intervened militarily in Czech dynastic conflicts. After his forces were removed from Bohemia in 1018, Bolesław retained Moravia. In 1013, the marriage between Bolesław's son Mieszko and Richeza of Lotharingia, the niece of Emperor Otto III and future mother of Casimir I the Restorer, took place. The conflicts with Germany ended in 1018 with the Peace of Bautzen accord, on favorable terms for Bolesław, retaining control of Lusatia. In the context of the 1018 Kiev expedition, Bolesław retook the Czerwień Cities. In 1019, Poland lost Brześć to the Kyivan Rus', but retook it the following year. In 1025, shortly before his death, Bolesław I the Brave finally succeeded in obtaining the papal permission to crown himself, and became the first king of Poland.

=== 1039–1076 ===
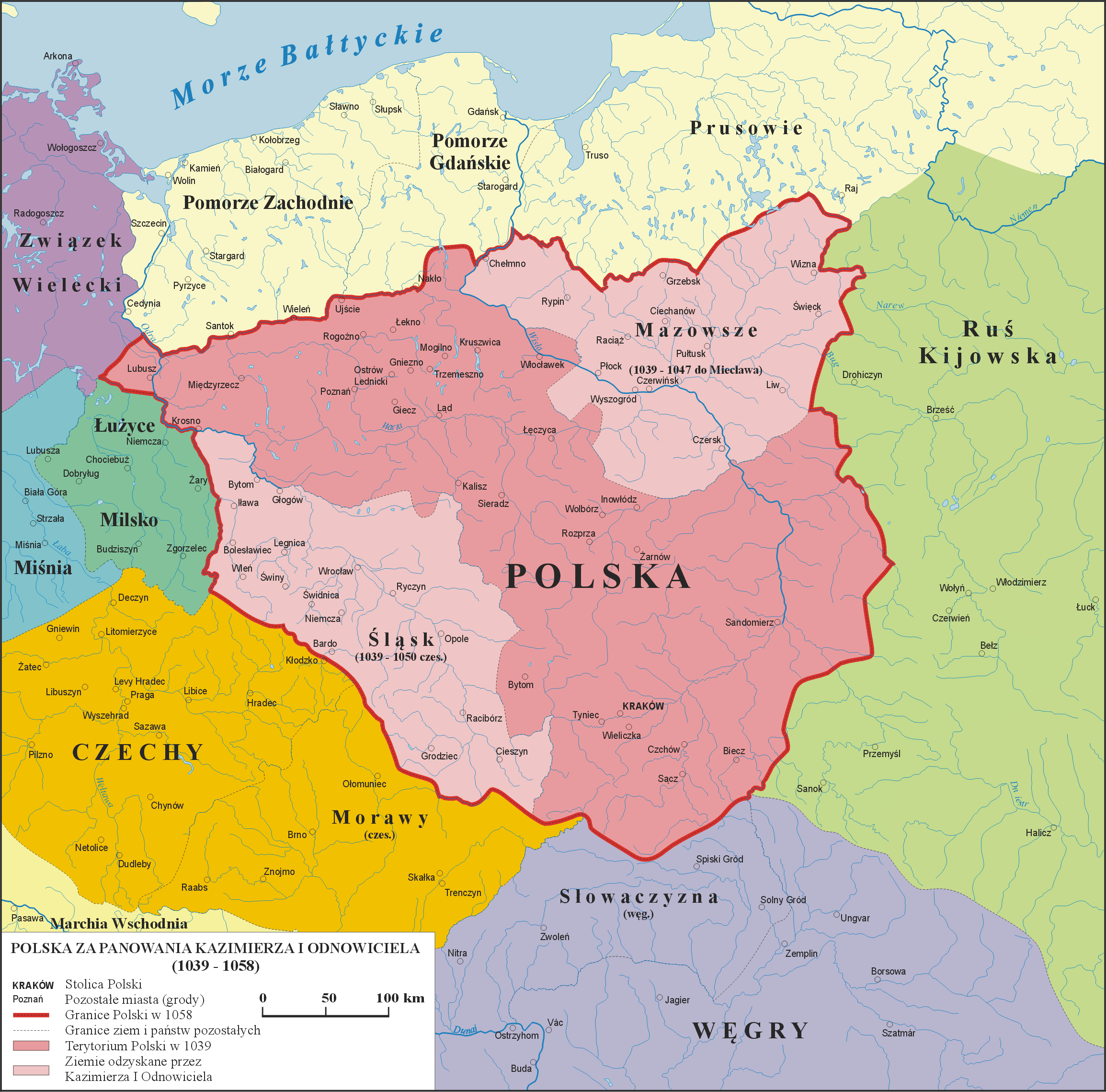
Poland during the rule of Casimir I of Poland

The first Piast monarchy collapsed after the death of Bolesław's son – king Mieszko II in 1034. Deprived of a government, Poland was ravaged by an anti-feudal and pagan rebellion, and in 1039 by the forces of King Bretislav of Bohemia. The country suffered territorial losses, and the functioning of the Gniezno archdiocese was disrupted.

According to various sources, either in 1042 or 1044 Poland lost Brześć to the Kyivan Rus'.

After returning from exile in 1039, Duke Casimir I (1016–1058), properly known as the Restorer, rebuilt the Polish monarchy and the country's territorial integrity through several military campaigns: in 1047, Masovia was taken back from Miecław, and in 1050 Silesia from the Czechs. Casimir was aided by the recent adversaries of Poland, the Holy Roman Empire and Kievan Rus, both of whom disliked its internal chaos. Casimir's son Bolesław II the Generous managed to restore most of the country's strength and influence and was able to crown himself king in 1076. By 1076 Bolesław II recaptured Brześć. In 1079 there was an anti-Bolesław conspiracy or conflict that involved the Bishop of Kraków. Bolesław had Bishop Stanislaus of Szczepanów executed; subsequently Bolesław was forced to abdicate the Polish throne because of the pressure from the Catholic Church and the pro-imperial faction of the nobility. The rule over Poland passed into the hands of his younger brother Władysław Herman.

=== 1125–1138 ===
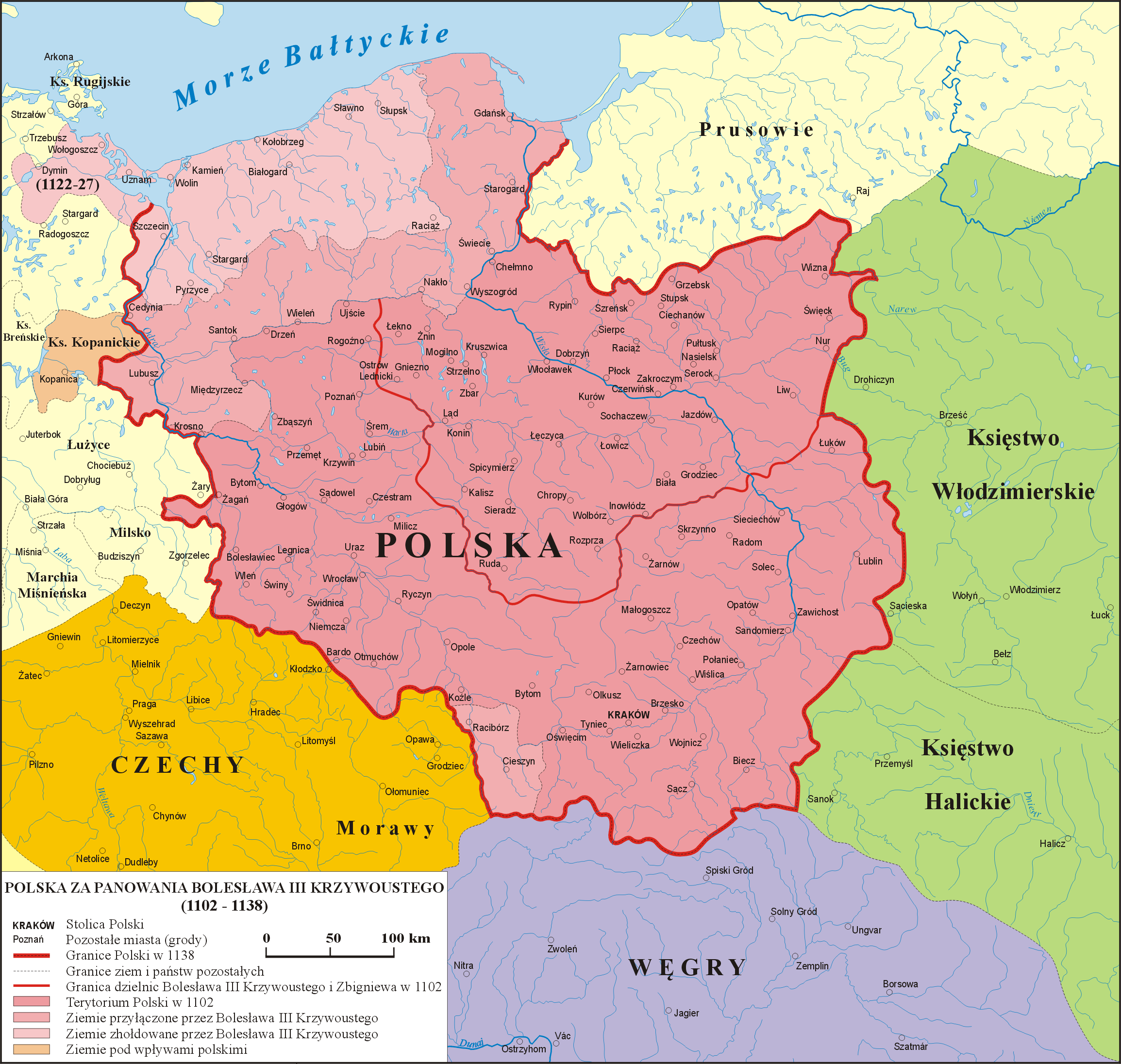
Poland during the rule of Bolesław III Wrymouth

After a power struggle, Bolesław III the Wry-mouthed (son of Władysław Herman, ruled 1102–1138) became the Duke of Poland by defeating his half-brother in 1106–1107. Bolesław III's major achievement was the reconquest of all of Mieszko I's Pomerania, a task begun by his father and completed by Bolesław around 1123. Szczecin was subdued in a bloody takeover and Western Pomerania up to Rügen (Polish: Rugia), except for the directly incorporated southern part, became Bolesław's fief, to be ruled locally by Wartislaw I, the first duke of the Griffin dynasty.

At this time, Christianization of the region was initiated in earnest, an effort crowned by the establishment of the Pomeranian Diocese of Wolin after Bolesław's death in 1140.

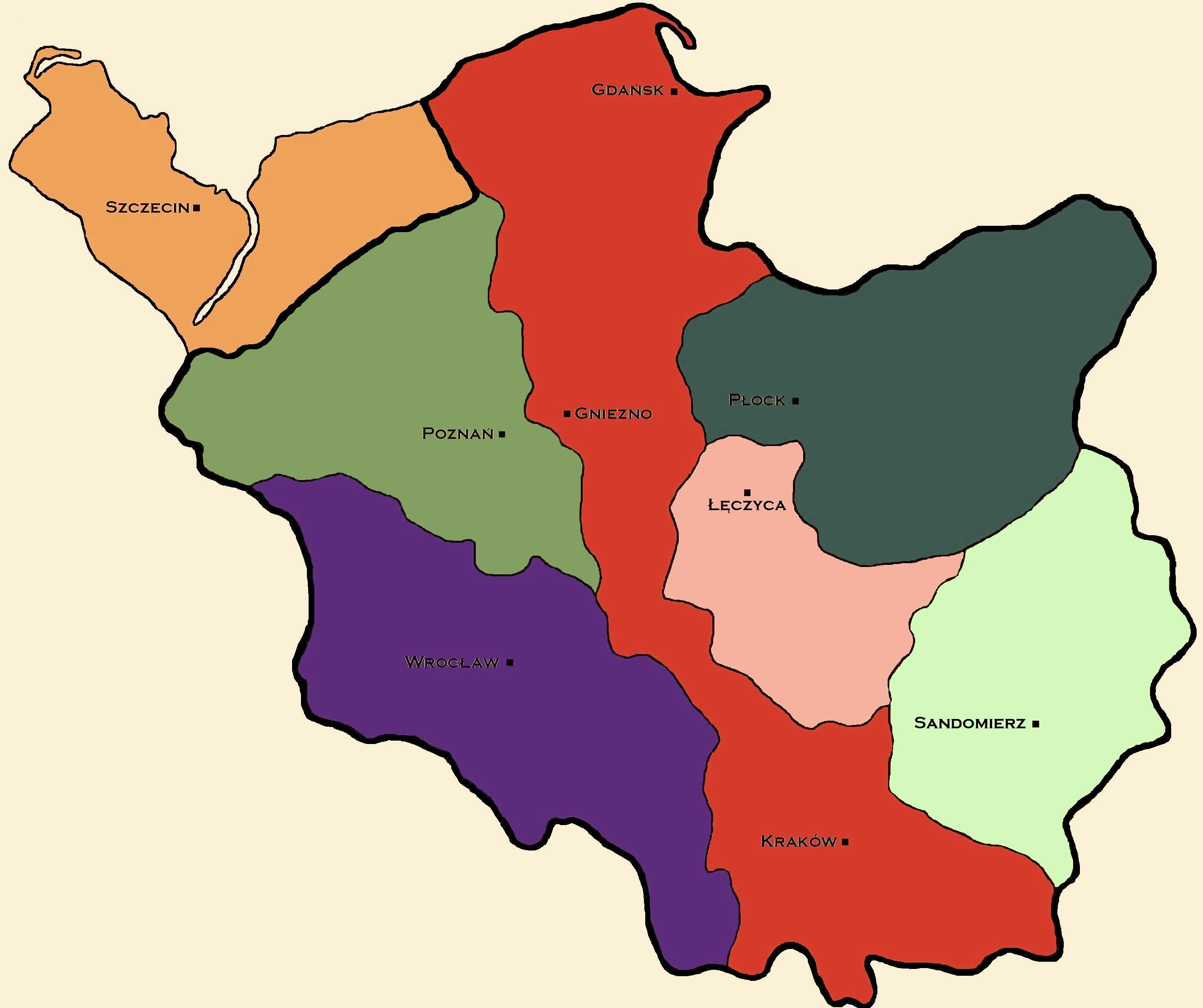
Testament of Bolesław III Krzywousty: The Seniorate Province of Władysław II, composed of Eastern Greater Poland, Lesser Poland, Western Kuyavia, Wieluń Land Pomeranian vassals of the High Duke of Poland Silesian Province of Władysław II Masovian Province of Bolesław IV composed of Masovia and Eastern Kuyavia Greater Poland Province of Mieszko III composed of Western Great Poland Sandomierz Province of Henry Łęczyca Province (Łęczyca Land and Sieradz Land) the annuity of the widow – Salomea

The Testament of Bolesław III Krzywousty was a political act by the Piast duke Bolesław III Wrymouth of Poland, in which he established rules for governance of the Polish kingdom by his four surviving sons after his death. By issuing it, Bolesław planned to guarantee that his heirs would not fight among themselves, and would preserve the unity of his lands under the House of Piast. However, he failed; soon after his death his sons fought each other, and Poland entered a period of fragmentation lasting about 200 years.

=== 1211–1238 ===
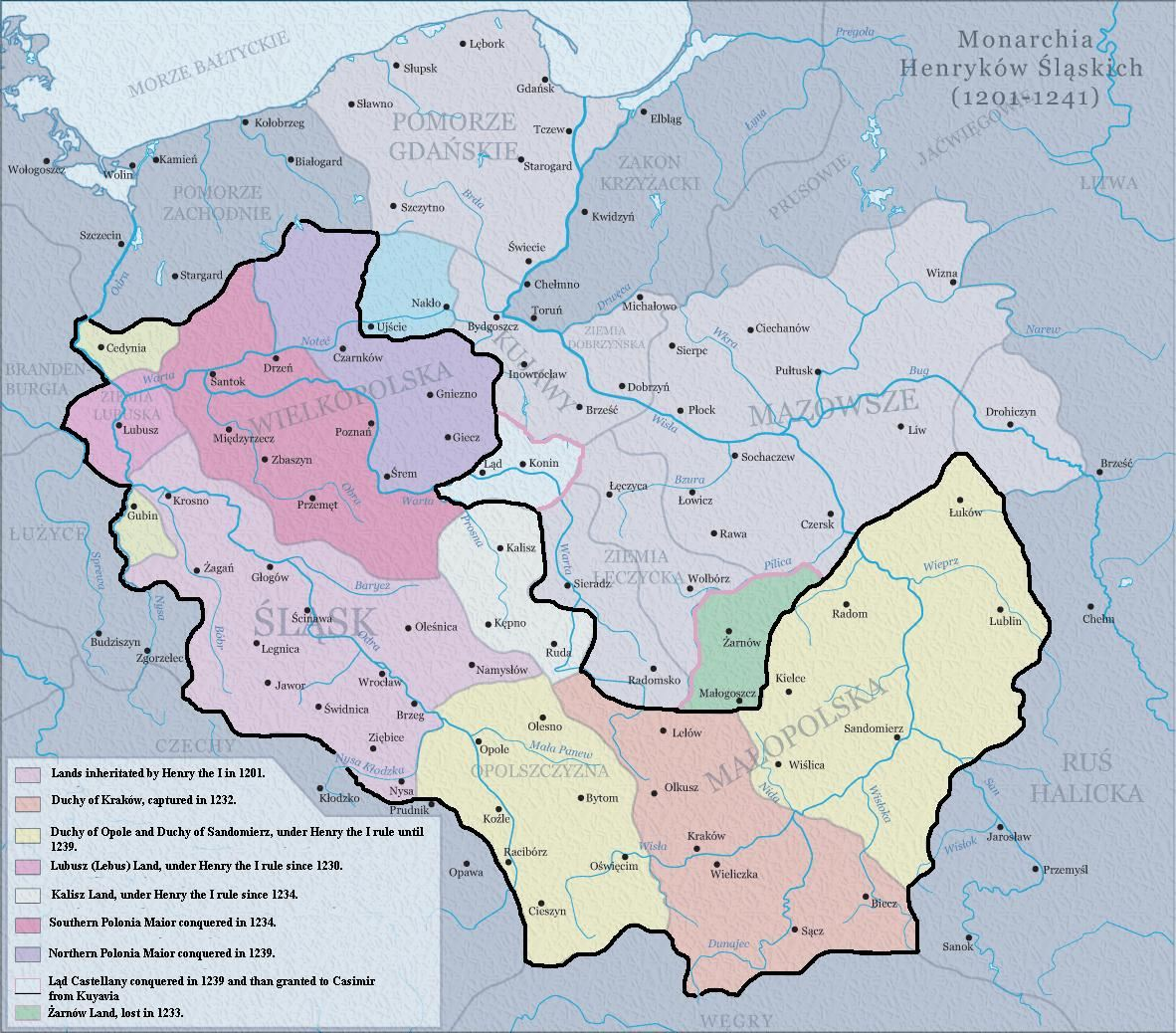
Monarchy of the Silesian Henries.

In the first half of the 13th century Silesian duke Henry I the Bearded, reunited much of the divided Kingdom of Poland (Regnum Poloniae). His expeditions led him as far north as the Duchy of Pomerania, where for a short time he held some of its southern areas. In the west he regained eastern Lower Lusatia with the towns of Gubin and Lubsko by 1211. He became the duke of Kraków (Polonia Minor) in 1232, which gave him the title of senior duke of Poland (see Testament of Bolesław III Krzywousty), and came into possession of most of Greater Poland in 1234. Henry failed in his attempt to achieve the Polish crown. His activity in this field was continued by his son and successor Henry II the Pious, until his sudden death in 1241 (Battle of Legnica). His successors were not able to maintain their holdings outside of Silesia, which were lost to other Piast dukes. Polish historians refer to territories acquired by Silesian dukes in this period as Monarchia Henryków śląskich ("The monarchy of the Silesian Henries"). In those days Wrocław was the political center of the divided Kingdom of Poland.

=== 1248–1305 ===
Few years after the death of Henry II the Pious his son – Bolesław II the Bald – sold the northwest part of his duchy – the Lubusz Land – to Magdeburg's Archbishop Wilbrand von Käfernburg and the Ascanian margraves of Brandenburg. This had far reaching negative consequences for the integrity of the western border, leading to an expansion of Brandenburg possessions into the east of Odra river. As a result, a wide piece of land was annexed from Poland and Pomerania that together with Lubusz Land formed the newly established Brandenburgian province of Neumark. Brandenburg further expanded by gradual annexation of north-western Greater Poland, including Wałcz, Drezdenko and Kalisz Pomorski in 1296, Międzyrzecz in 1297 and Czaplinek by c. 1300.

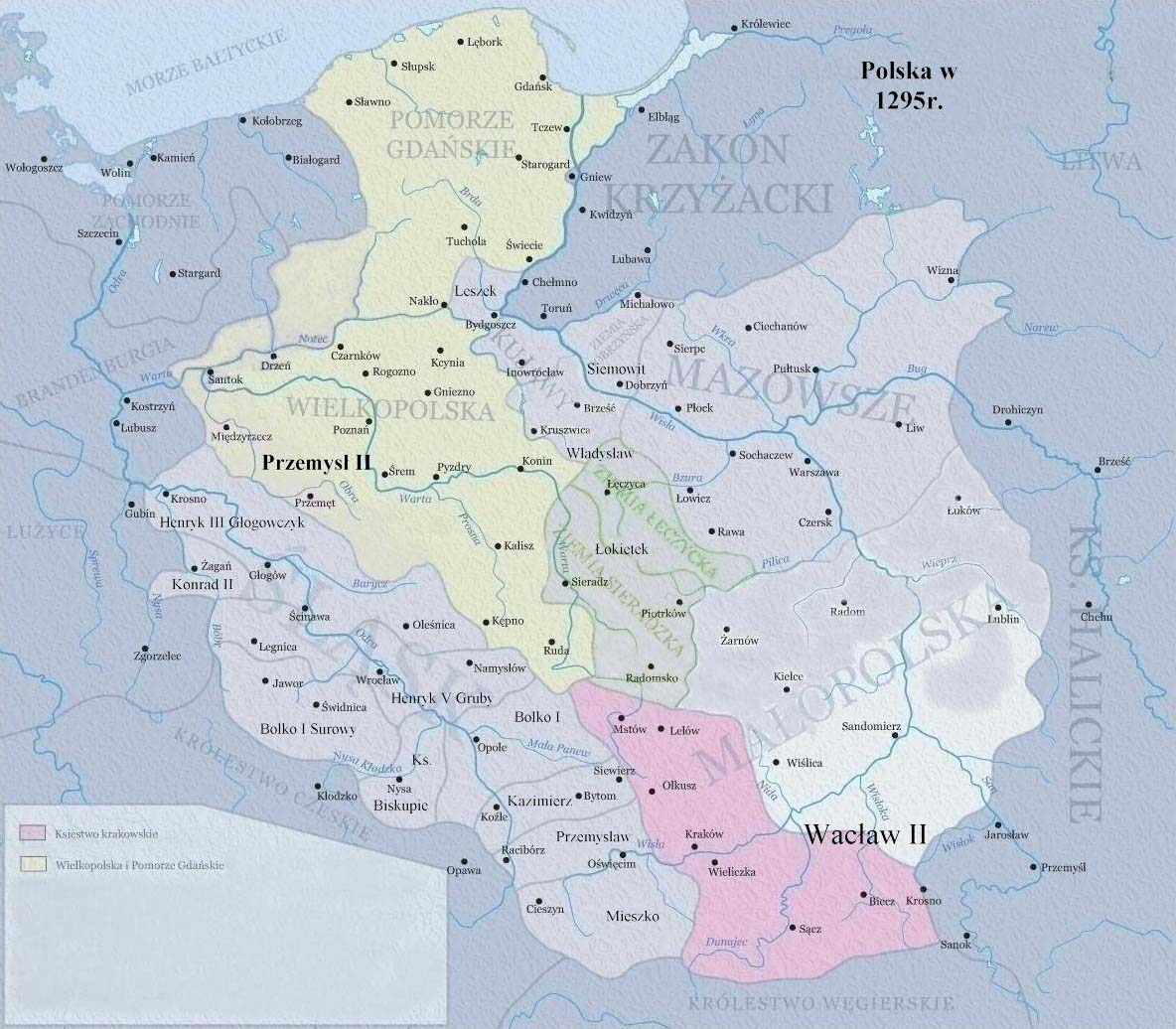
Poland in the times of Przemysł

In 1278, the Kłodzko Land passed to the Duchy of Wrocław of fragmented Poland, and in c. 1290 it passed to Bohemia.

In 1295, Przemysł II of Greater Poland became the first, since Bolesław II, Piast duke crowned as King of Poland, but he ruled over only a part of the territory of Poland (including from 1294 Gdańsk Pomerania) and was assassinated soon after his coronation.

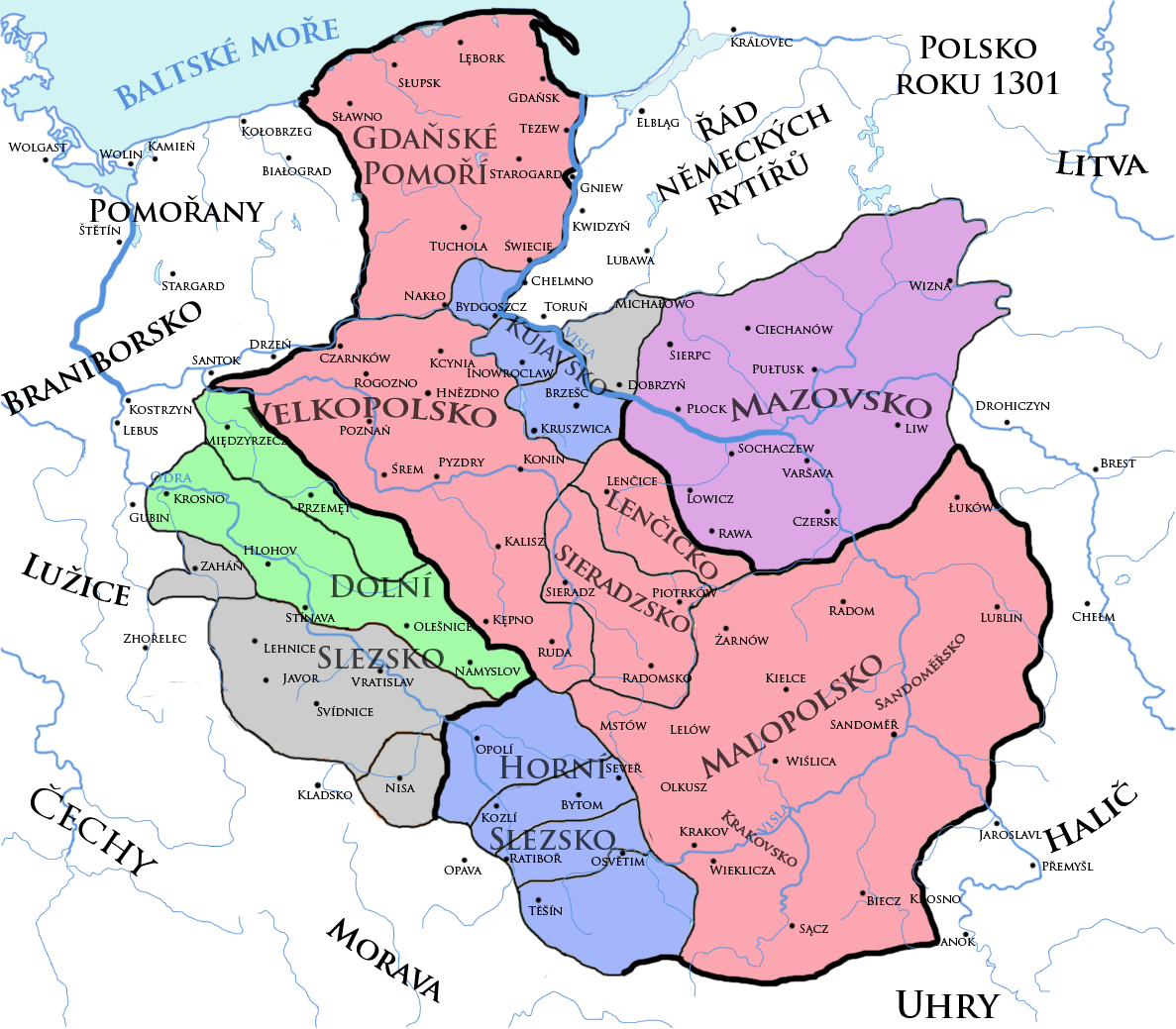
Poland in the times of Wenceslaus II: Polish lands under the direct control of Wenceslaus II Polish lands ruled by Piast dukes who accepted Wenceslaus sovereignty as king of Poland

A more extensive unification of Polish lands was accomplished by a foreign ruler, Wenceslaus II of Bohemia of the Přemyslid dynasty, who married Przemysł's daughter and became King of Poland in 1300. Václav's heavy-handed policies soon caused him to lose whatever support he had earlier in his reign; he died in 1305.

=== 1308–1333 ===
After the death of Wenceslaus III of Bohemia – son of Wenceslaus II – in 1306, most of the Polish Lands came under the rule of duke Władysław I the Elbow-high. However at this points, various foreign states were staking their claims on some parts of Poland. Margraviate of Brandenburg invaded Pomerelia in 1308, leading Władysław I the Elbow-high to request assistance from the Teutonic Knights, who evicted the Brandenburgers but took the area for themselves, annexed and incorporated it into the Teutonic Order state in 1309 (Teutonic takeover of Danzig (Gdańsk) and Treaty of Soldin/Myślibórz). This event caused a long-lasting dispute between Poland and the Teutonic Order over the control of Gdańsk Pomerania. It resulted in a series of Polish–Teutonic Wars throughout 14th and 15th centuries. 14th-century papal verdicts ordered the restoration of the area to Poland, however, the Teutonic Knights did not comply and continued to occupy the region.

In the early 14th century, Poland lost northern Spisz with the town of Podoliniec to the Kingdom of Hungary.

During this time, all Silesian dukes accepted Władysław's claims for sovereignty over other Piasts. After acquiring papal consent for his coronation, all nine dukes of Silesia declared twice (in 1319 before and in 1320 after the coronation) that their realms lay inside the borders of the Polish Kingdom. However, despite formal papal consent for the coronation, Władysław's right to the crown was disputed by successors of Wenceslaus III (a king of both Bohemia and Poland) on the Bohemian throne. In 1327 John of Bohemia invaded. After the intervention of King Charles I of Hungary he left Polonia Minor, but on his way back he enforced his supremacy over the Upper Silesian Piasts.

In 1319, Duchy of Jawor, the southwesternmost duchy of fragmented Poland, expanded its western border to Lusatia, reaching the towns of Zgorzelec, Zły Komorów, Żytawa, Ostrowiec and Rychbach. After the 1319 extinction of Ascanian margraves of Brandenburg, the previously lost Lubusz Land and New March were the subject of rivalry between the Piasts (dukes of Jawor, Żagań and King Władysław I the Elbow-high), Griffins of Pomerania, the Ascanians of Saxe-Wittenberg and the Wittelsbachs of Bavaria until 1326, with Polish dukes capturing portions of the region at various times, but not permanently, except for the Międzyrzecz castellany which was decisively restored to the Kingdom of Poland.

In 1329 Władysław I the Elbow-high fought with the Teutonic Order. The Order was supported by John of Bohemia who dominated the dukes of Masovia and Lower Silesia.

=== 1333–1370 ===
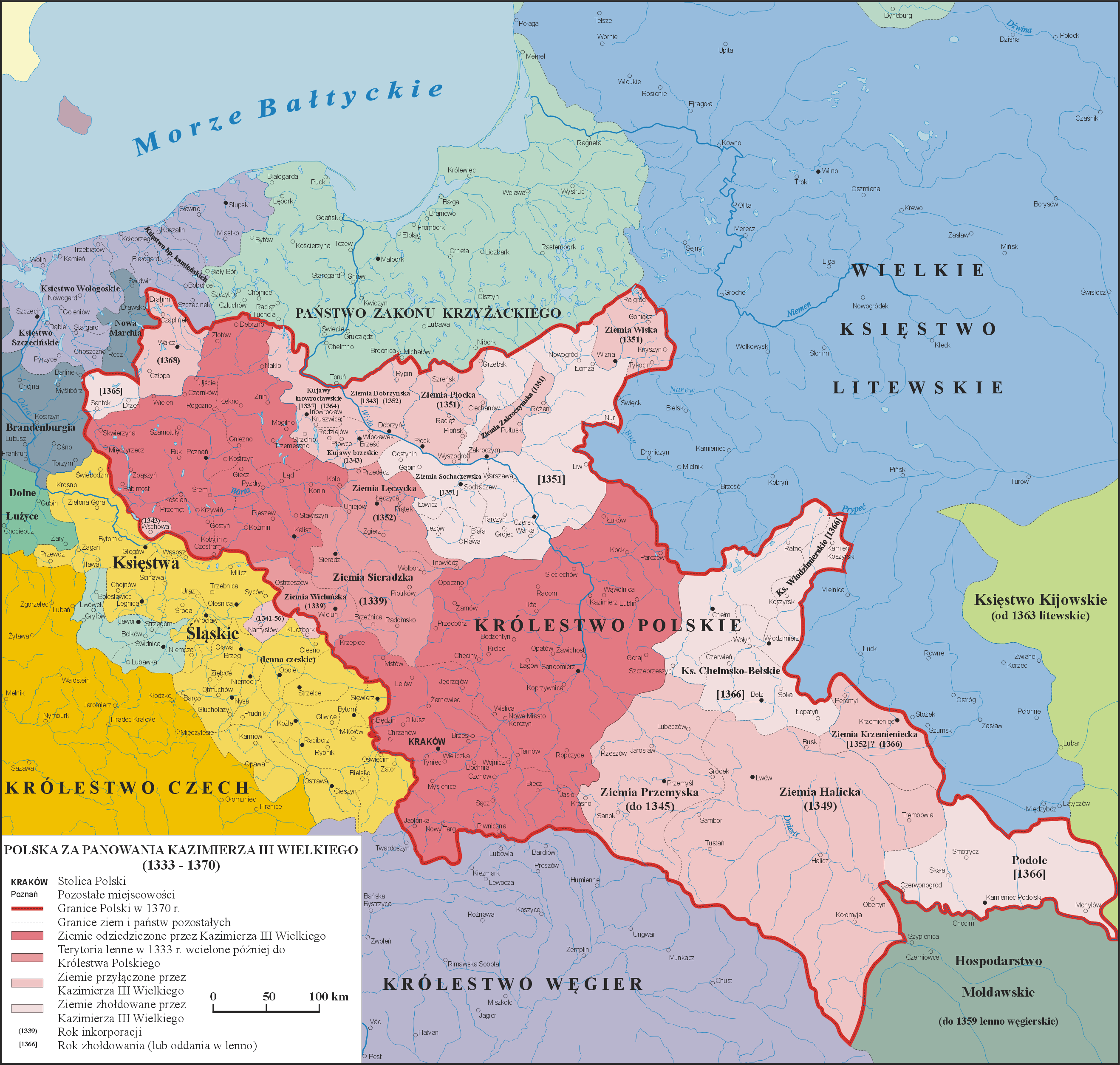
Poland during the reign of Casimir III the Great

In 1335 John of Bohemia renounced his claim in favour of Casimir III the Great, who in return renounced his claims to the Silesia province. This was formalized in the Treaty of Trencin and Congress of Visegrád (1335), ratified in 1339 and later confirmed in the 1348 Treaty of Namysłów.

King Casimir, being deprived of historically and ethnically Polish lands of Silesia and Pomerelia sought a compensation of this loses in the east, though in 1341–1356 he regained control of the towns of Byczyna, Kluczbork, Namysłów and Wołczyn in Lower Silesia. Through a series of military campaigns between 1340 and 1366 Casimir had retook the previously lost Czerwień Cities and further annexed Red Ruthenia, western Volhynia with Włodzimierz, and western Podolia with Kamieniec Podolski. The city of Lwów quickly developed to become a main town of this new region.

Allied with Denmark and the Duchy of Pomerania, Casimir was able to impose some corrections on the western border as well. In 1365 Drezdenko and Santok became Poland's fiefs, while Wałcz, Człopa, Tuczno and Czaplinek were in 1368 recovered outright, severing the land connection between Brandenburg and the Teutonic state and connecting Poland with Farther Pomerania.

== Kingdom of Poland 1385 to 1569 ==
Territorial changes during the Kingdom of Poland, starting with the Union of Krewo and ending with the Union of Lublin.

In 1387, Petru II of Moldavia paid homage to Polish King Władysław II Jagiełło and Queen Jadwiga of Poland making Moldavia a vassal principality of Poland.

In 1402, Poland and Bohemia reached an agreement, by which Poland was to buy and re-incorporate the previously lost territories of north-western Greater Poland, northern Lubusz Land and parts of Pomerania, which were since ruled as the New March, from 1373 within the Bohemian Crown Lands, but eventually the Bohemian rulers sold the area to the Teutonic Order. The area was briefly partially recaptured by the Poles during the Polish–Teutonic War of 1431–1435.

During the Polish–Lithuanian–Teutonic War, in 1410, the bulk of Gdańsk Pomerania with Gdańsk returned to Poland, but it fell back to the Teutonic Knights in 1411.

In 1412, 16 towns of Spisz were regained from Hungary to Poland.

Polish-Lithuanian union under Casimir IV Jagiellon

In February 1454, the anti-Teutonic Prussian Confederation asked Casimir IV Jagiellon to reincorporate Gdańsk Pomerania and Chełmno Land, and also incorporate Prussia, into the Kingdom of Poland, to which the King agreed and signed an act of incorporation in Kraków in March 1454. Various cities, towns, nobles and officials from the region immediately recognized Polish rule and pledged allegiance to Poland, recognizing the previous Teutonic rule as unlawful. This sparked the Thirteen Years' War, during which Poland for the most part retained control of the regained Pomeranian territories with the port city of Gdańsk, whereas control over the Prussian territories varied, with Poland retaining control of Elbląg for the entire time, but losing Królewiec back to the Teutonic Knights in 1455. In the peace treaty of 1466, Gdańsk Pomerania, Chełmno Land, Elbląg, Malbork and Warmia were recognized as reincorporated to Poland, whereas the remainder of historic Prussia remained with the Teutonic Order as a fief and protectorate of Poland, also considered an integral part of "one and indivisible" Kingdom of Poland. Poland regained free access to the Baltic Sea. In the meantime, in 1462, the city of Caffa in Crimea recognized Polish suzerainty.

In 1494, the Kingdom of Poland bought and regained the Duchy of Zator.

In 1525, during the Protestant Reformation, the Grand Master of the Teutonic Knights, Albert of Hohenzollern, secularized the order's Prussian territory, becoming Albert, Duke of Prussia. The Duchy of Prussia, which had its capital in Königsberg (Polish: Królewiec), was established as a fief of the Kingdom of Poland.

In the 1560s, Poland has expanded its Baltic dominion during the Livonian War, when it captured most of Livonia, with the major port city of Riga (Polish: Ryga). In 1561, the Livonian Confederation was dismantled and the Livonian Order, an order of German knights, was disbanded. On the basis of the Treaty of Vilnius, territories of modern Latvia and southern Estonia were ceded to the Grand Duchy of Lithuania and formed into the Duchy of Livonia. Poland also claimed northern Estonia with the city of Tallinn (Polish: Rewal) as incorporated per the treaty, and demanded the surrender of the territory conquered by Sweden, but Sweden refused. The Duchy of Courland and Semigallia was a vassal state of the Crown of the Polish Kingdom from 1569 to 1726, and incorporated into the Polish-Lithuanian Commonwealth in 1726. Lajs (now Laiuse, Estonia) was the seat of the northernmost starostwo of the history of Poland.

== Polish–Lithuanian Commonwealth 1569 to 1795 ==
Territorial changes during the Polish–Lithuanian Commonwealth, starting with the Union of Lublin and ending with the Third Partition of Poland.

Polish-Lithuanian forces recaptured the towns of Połock in 1579 and Wieliż, Uświat and Newel in 1580, previously annexed by Russia from Lithuania in 1562–1566. The restoration of Połock and Wieliż was confirmed in 1582, but Newel was lost again to Russia. In 1581, Poland also demanded the restoration of Siebież, but to no avail, and regained Siebież and Newel only in 1617–1618. During the war, Poland also temporarily controlled the more northern towns of Velikiye Luki, Opochka and Ostrov.

=== 1610 to 1619 ===
During the Polish–Russian War (1609–1618), the Polish-Lithuanian Commonwealth controlled Moscow for two years, from 29 September 1610 to 6 November 1612.

The Truce of Deulino of 1619 confirmed the recaptured Czernihów and Smolensk regions as part of Poland, and the regaining of the towns of Siebież and Newel.

=== 1634 ===
In 1634, the town of Sierpiejsk passed from Poland to Russia.

=== 1635 ===
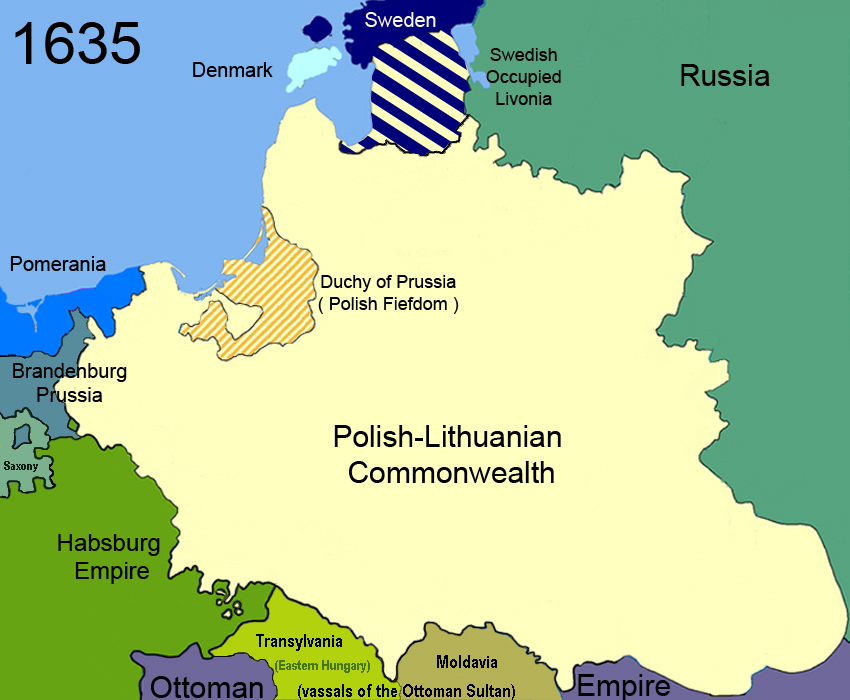
Blue and white stripes indicate Swedish control of Polish–Lithuanian Commonwealth territory. Orange and white stripes represents the Duchy of Prussia

Sweden, weakened by involvement in the Thirty Years' War, agreed to sign the Armistice of Stuhmsdorf (also known as Treaty of Sztumska Wieś or Treaty of Stuhmsdorf) in 1635, favourable to the Polish–Lithuanian Commonwealth in terms of territorial concessions.

=== 1644 ===
In 1644, the town of Trubczewsk passed from Poland to Russia.

=== 1655 ===
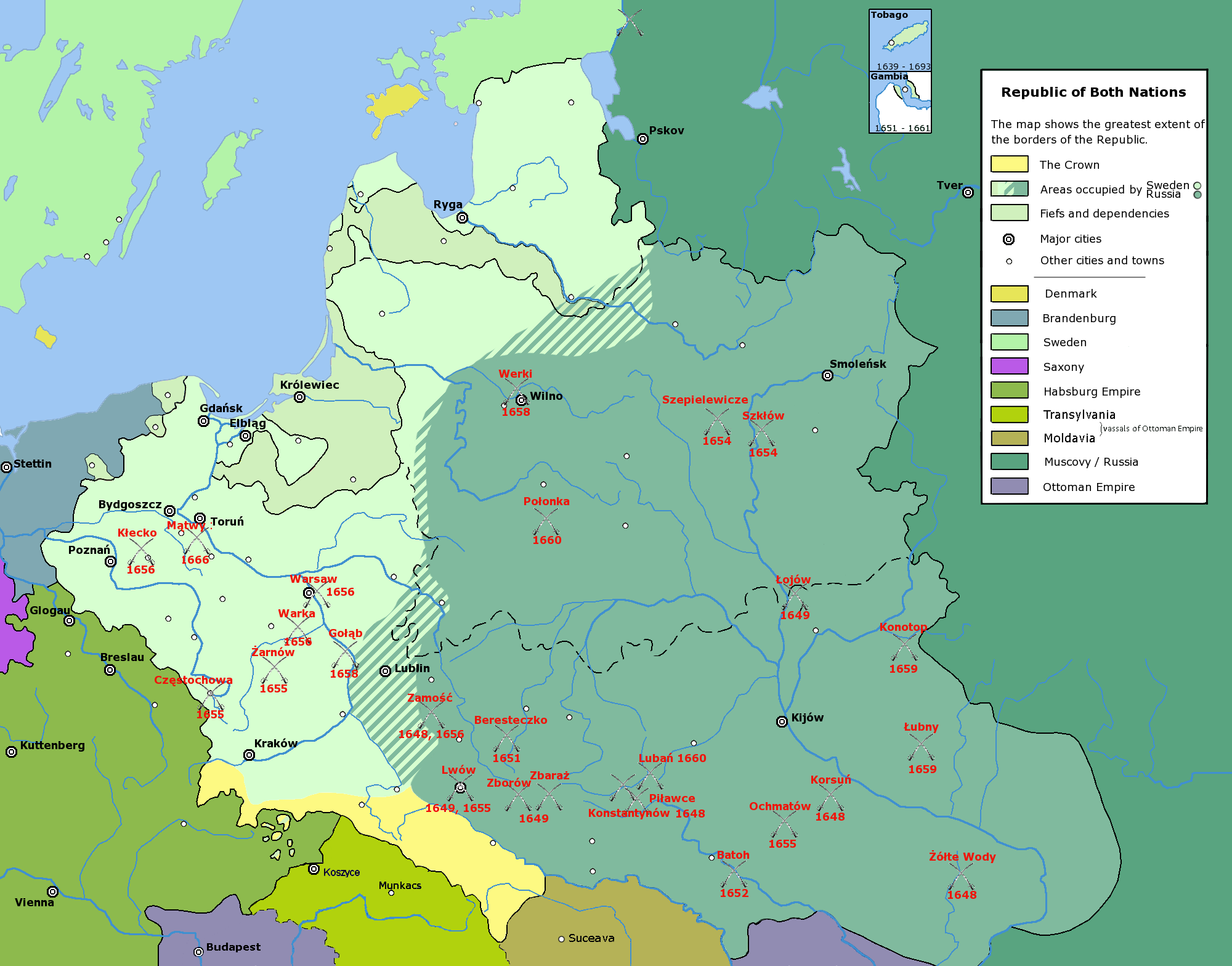
Swedish and Russian occupation of the Polish–Lithuanian Commonwealth during the Deluge

In the history of Poland and Lithuania, the Deluge refers to a series of wars in the mid-to-late 17th century that left the Polish–Lithuanian Commonwealth in ruins.

The Deluge refers to the Swedish invasion and occupation of the western half of Poland-Lithuania from 1655 to 1660 and the Khmelnytsky Uprising in 1648, which led to Russia's invasion during the Russo-Polish War.

=== 1657 ===
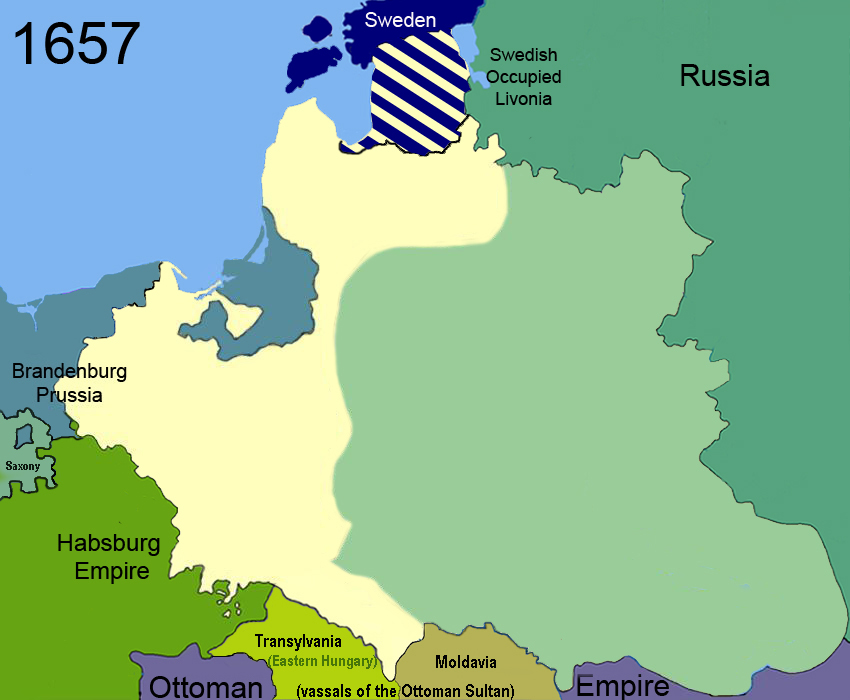
Blue and white stripes indicate Swedish control of the Polish–Lithuanian Commonwealth territory. Light green represents Russian occupation

The Treaty of Wehlau was a treaty signed on September 19, 1657, in the town of Wehlau (Welawa, now Znamensk), Ducal Prussia, between Poland and Brandenburg-Prussia during the Swedish Deluge. The treaty renounced Polish suzerainty over Ducal Prussia and recognized sole Brandenburgian rule over the duchy, in recognition of the Brandenburgian Elector help against the Swedish forces during the Deluge. There was strong opposition to the separation of the region from Poland, especially in Königsberg (Polish: Królewiec).

=== 1660 ===
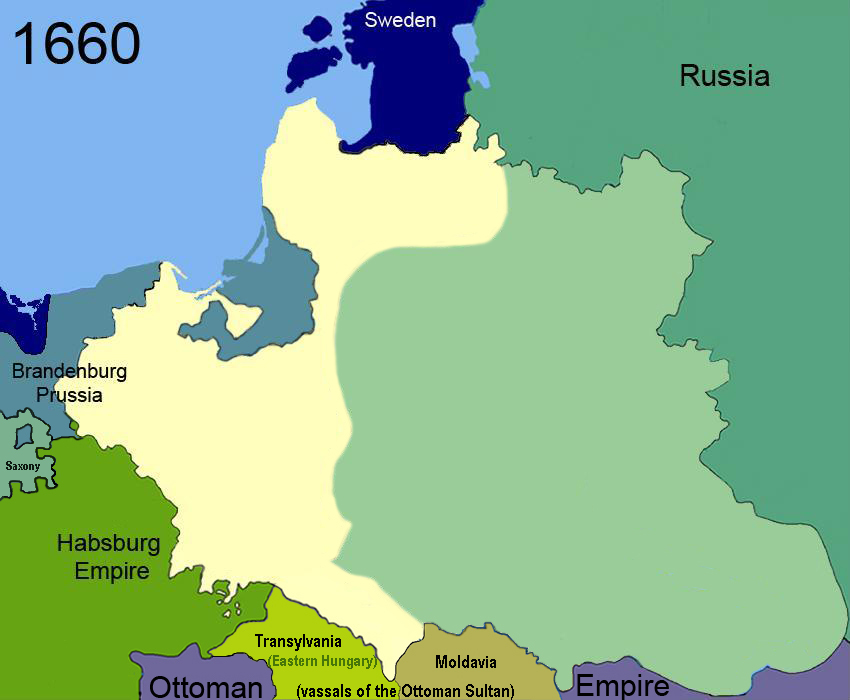
Light green represents Russian occupation of the Polish–Lithuanian Commonwealth territory

In the Treaty of Oliva, the Polish King, John II Casimir, renounced his claims to the Swedish crown, which his father Sigismund III Vasa had lost in 1599. Poland formally ceded Swedish Livonia and the city of Riga, which had been under de facto Swedish control since the 1620s. The signing of the treaty ended Swedish involvement in the Deluge.

=== 1667 ===
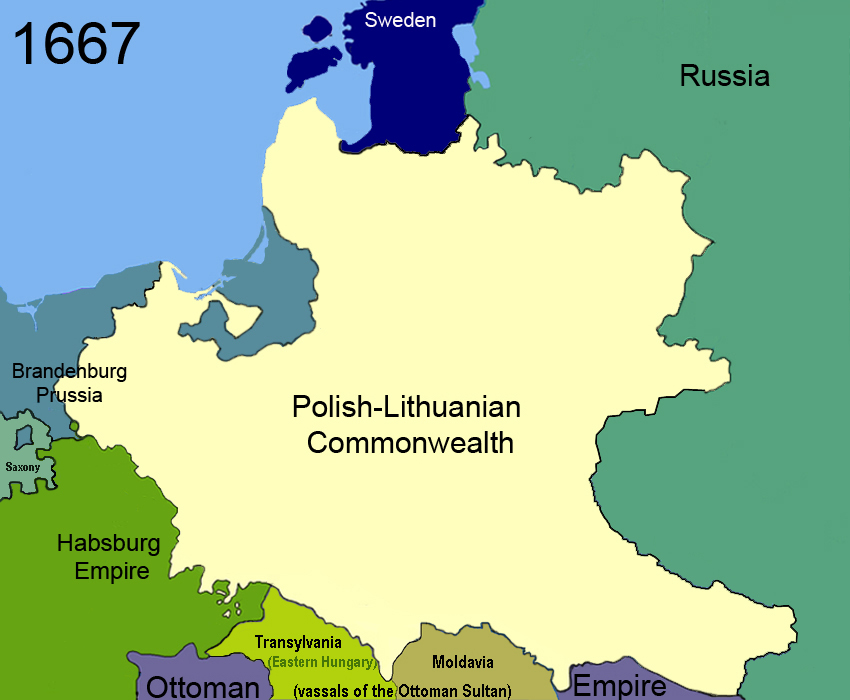
Territorial changes of the Polish–Lithuanian Commonwealth in 1667

The War for Ukraine ended with the Treaty of Andrusovo of January 13, 1667. The peace settlement gave Moscow control over the Left-bank Ukraine with the Polish Commonwealth retaining Right-bank Ukraine. The signing of the Treaty ended Russian occupation of the Polish confederation and the Deluge war. Since the war started the population of the Polish–Lithuanian Commonwealth had been nearly halved by war and disease. War had destroyed the economic base of the cities and raised a religious fervour that ended Poland's policy of religious tolerance.

=== 1672 ===
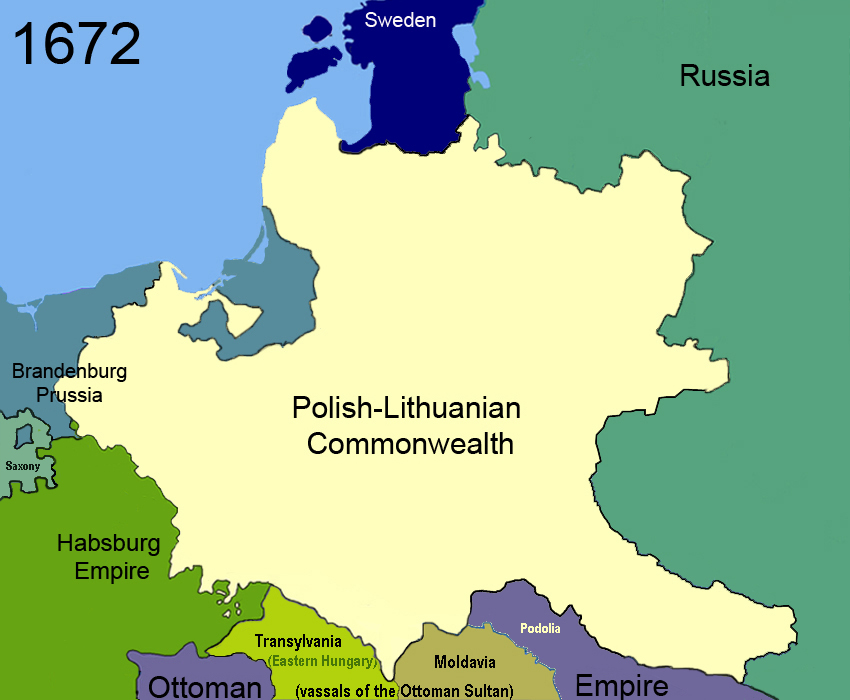
The Polish–Lithuanian Commonwealth lost the territory of Podolia in 1672

As a result of the Polish–Ottoman War the Polish commonwealth ceded Podolia in the 1672 Treaty of Buczacz.

=== 1676 ===
Part of Podolia restored to Poland under King John III Sobieski.

=== 1686 ===
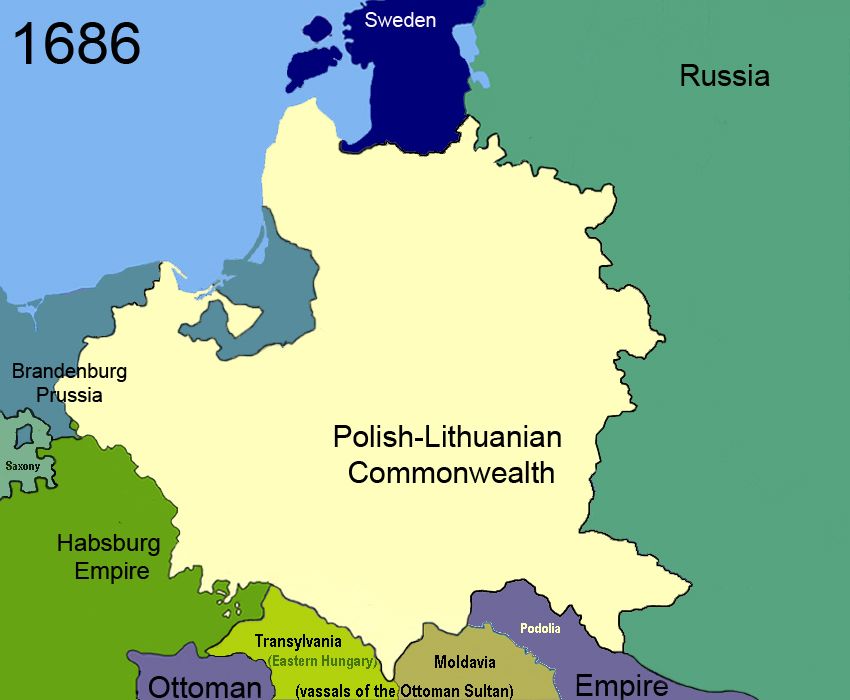
Territorial changes of the Polish–Lithuanian Commonwealth in 1686

The Eternal Peace Treaty of 1686 was a treaty between the Tsardom of Russia and the Polish–Lithuanian Commonwealth signed on May 6, 1686, in Moscow. It confirmed the earlier Truce of Andrusovo of 1667. The treaty secured Russia's possession of the Left-bank Ukraine, Zaporizhzhia, Seversk lands, the cities of Chernihiv, Starodub, and Smolensk and its outskirts, while Poland retained Right-bank Ukraine.

=== 1699 ===
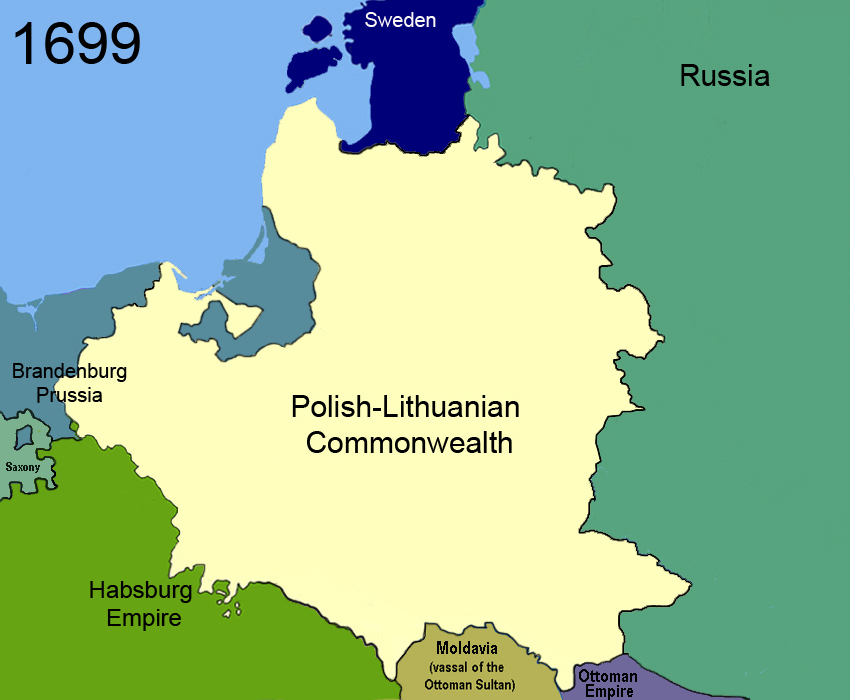
Territorial changes of the Polish–Lithuanian Commonwealth in 1699

The Treaty of Karlowitz, or Treaty of Karlovci, was signed on January 26, 1699, in Sremski Karlovci, a town in modern-day Serbia, following a two-month congress between the Ottoman Empire and the Holy League of 1684, a coalition of various European powers including the Habsburg Monarchy, the Polish–Lithuanian Commonwealth, the Republic of Venice, and the Russia of Peter I Alekseyevich. The treaty concluded the Austro-Ottoman War of 1683–1697, in which the Ottoman side had finally been defeated at the Battle of Senta. The Ottomans returned the remainder of Podolia to Poland.

=== 1772 ===
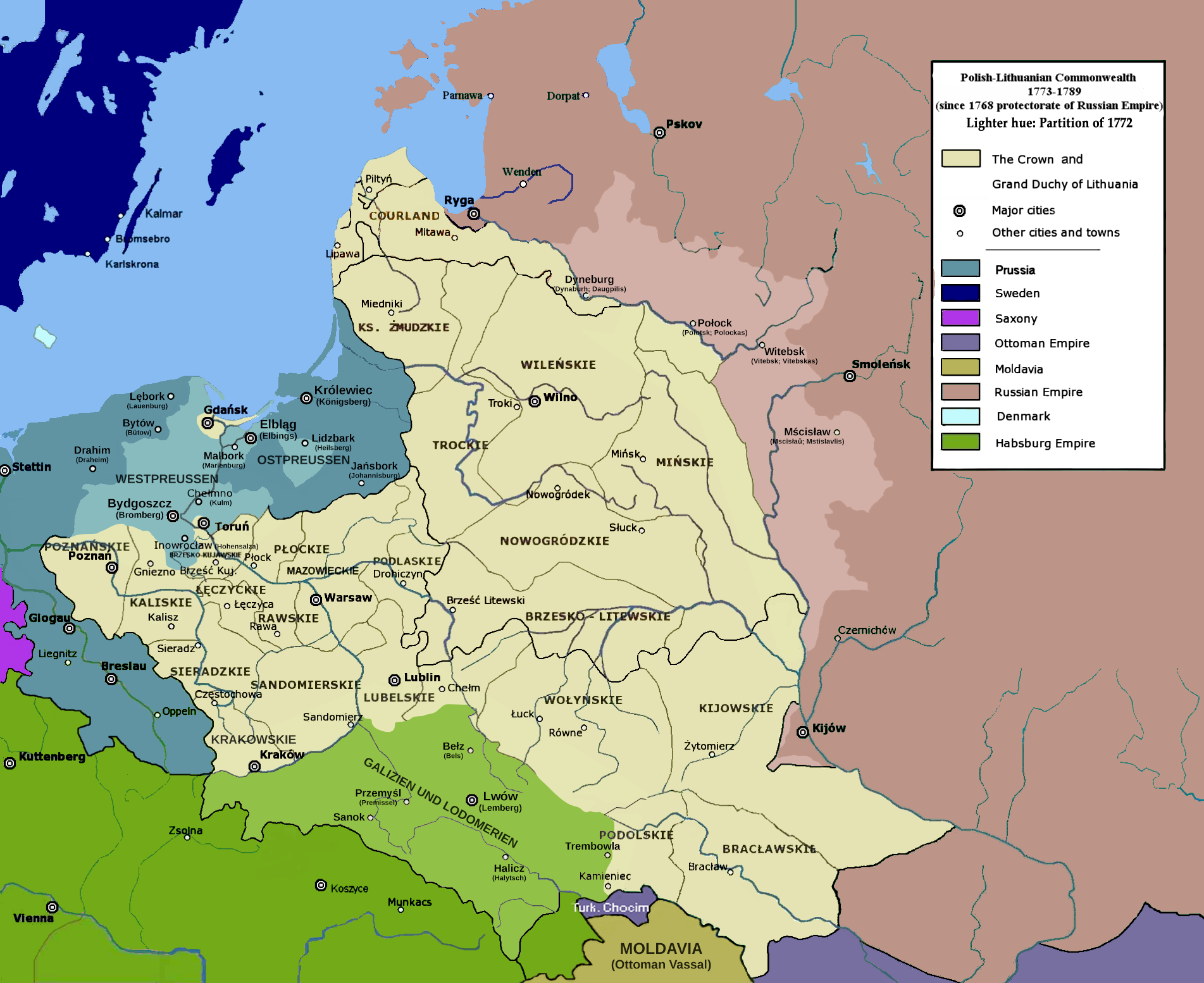
First partition of the Polish–Lithuanian Commonwealth in 1772

In February 1772, an agreement for the partition of the Polish–Lithuanian Commonwealth was signed in Vienna. Early in August Russian, Prussian and Austrian troops simultaneously entered the Commonwealth and occupied the provinces agreed upon among themselves.

By the first partition in 1772, the Polish–Lithuanian Commonwealth lost about 211,000 square kilometres (81,000 sq mi) (30% of its territory, amounting at that time to about 733,000 square kilometres (283,000 sq mi)), with a population of over four to five million people (about a third of its population of 14 million before the partition). Prussia annexed Warmia, Powiśle, northern Greater Poland and most of Polish Pomerania, except for the city of Gdańsk, which remained a Polish exclave. Austria annexed a large portion of southern Poland with the major city of Lwów. Russia annexed territories in the north-east and east, in historic Latgale and White Ruthenia.

=== 1793 ===
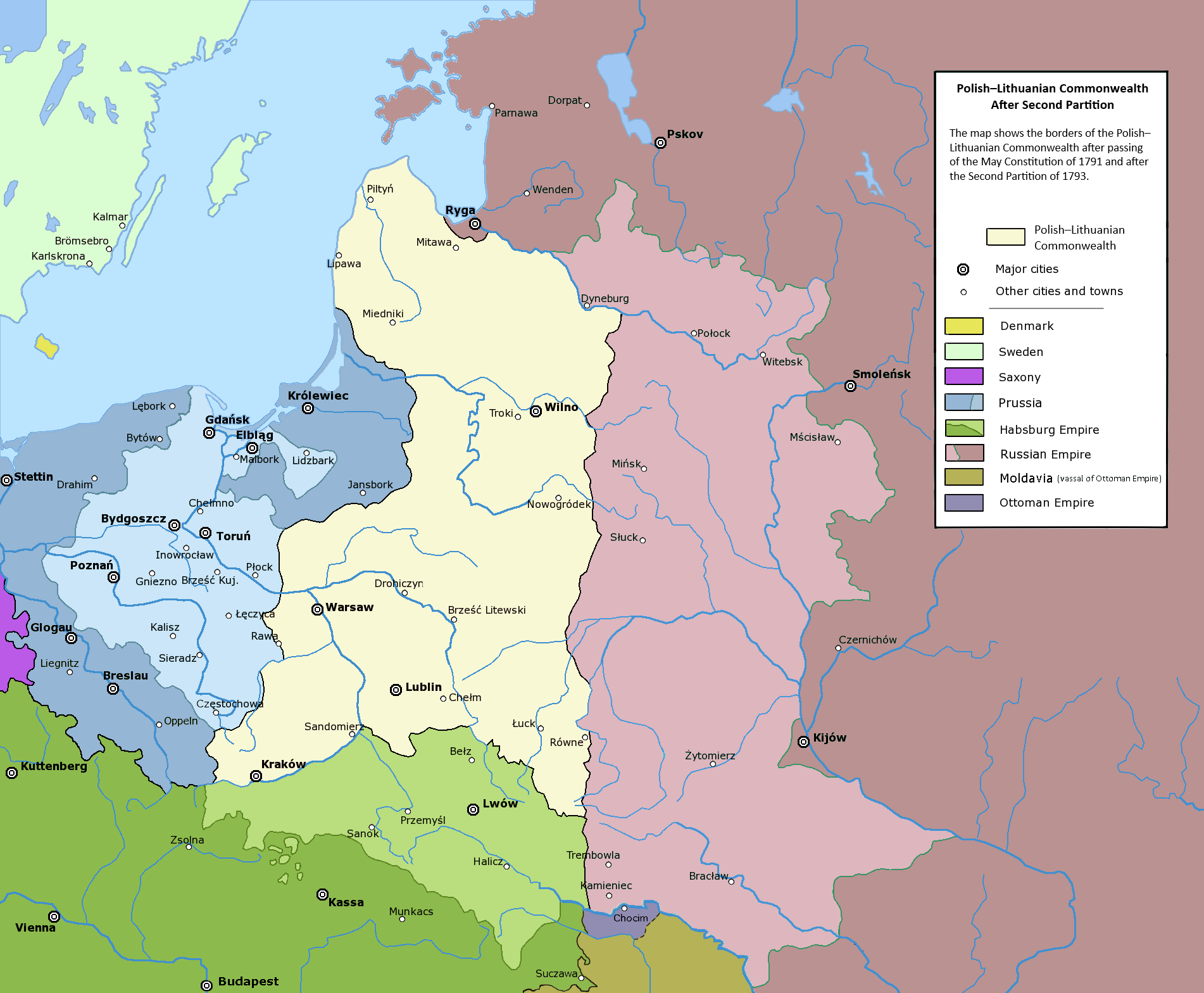
Second partition of the Polish–Lithuanian Commonwealth in 1793

By the 1790s the First Polish Republic had deteriorated into such a helpless condition that it was successfully forced into an alliance with its enemy, Prussia. The alliance was cemented with the Polish–Prussian Pact of 1790. The conditions of the Pact were such that the succeeding and final two partitions of Poland were inevitable. The May Constitution of 1791 enfranchised the bourgeoisie, established the separation of the three branches of government, and eliminated the abuses of Repnin Sejm.

Those reforms prompted aggressive actions on the part of Poland's neighbours, wary of a potential renaissance of the Commonwealth. In the second partition, Russia and Prussia took so much territory that only one-third of the 1772 population remained in Poland.

=== 1795 ===
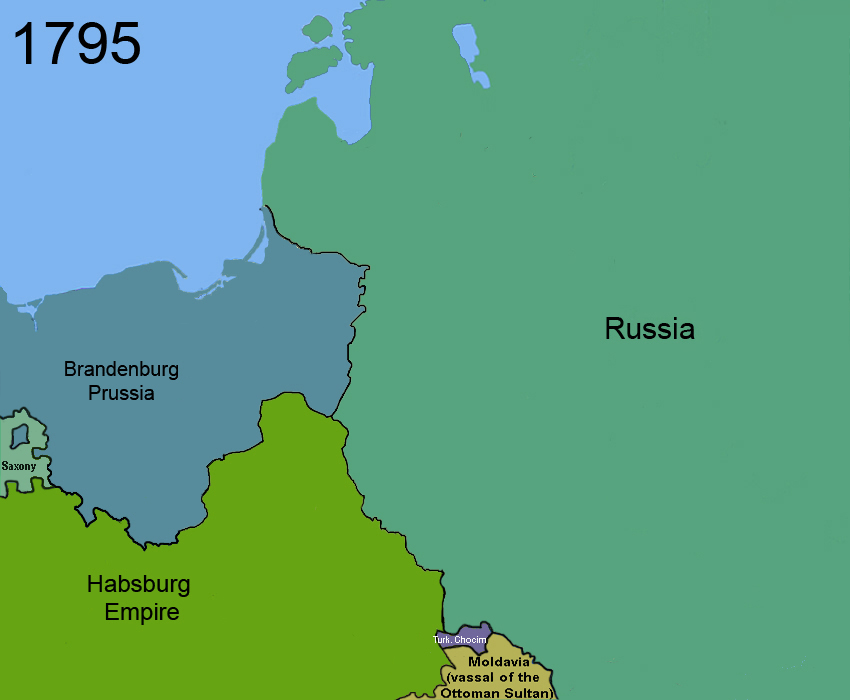
The former territory of the Polish–Lithuanian Commonwealth as a part of the Brandenburg–Prussia, Habsburg Empire, and Russian Empire after the third partition in 1795

Kosciuszko's insurgent armies, who fought to regain Polish territory, won some initial successes but they eventually fell before the forces of the Russian Empire. The partitioning powers, seeing the increasing unrest in the remaining Commonwealth, decided to solve the problem by erasing any independent Polish state from the map. On 24 October 1795 their representatives signed a treaty dividing the remaining territories of the Commonwealth between their three countries.

== Partitioned Poland 1795 to 1918 ==
Territorial changes during the time after the Partitions, starting with the Third Partition of Poland and ending with the creation of the Second Polish Republic.

=== 1807 ===
==== Duchy of Warsaw ====
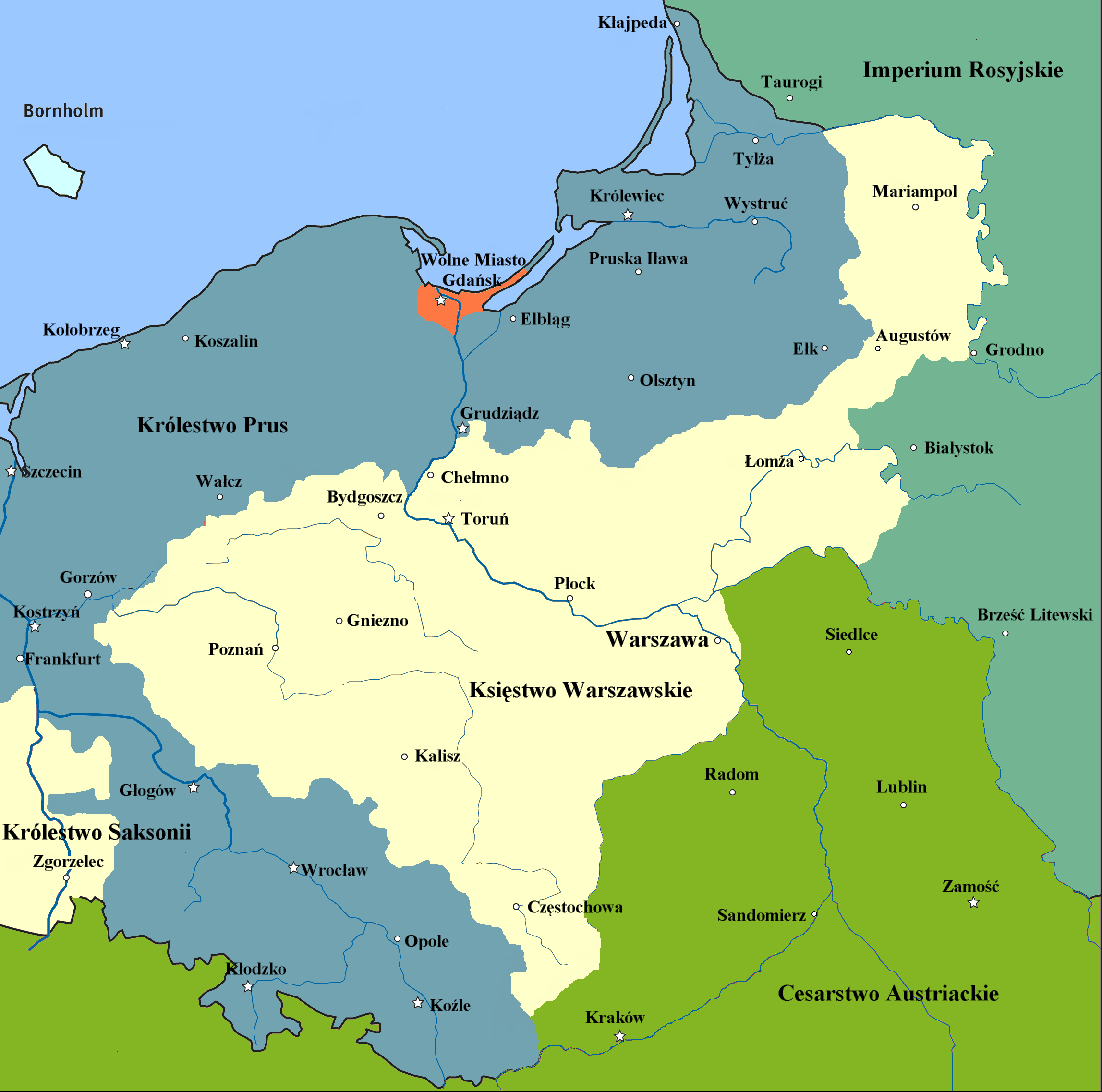

Napoleon's attempts to build and expand his empire kept Europe at war for almost a decade and brought him into conflict with the same European powers that had beleaguered Poland in the last decades of the previous century. An alliance of convenience was the result of this situation. Volunteer Polish legions attached themselves to Bonaparte's armies, hoping that in return the emperor would allow an independent Poland to reappear out of his conquests.

The Duchy of Warsaw was a Polish state established by Napoleon in 1807 from the Polish lands ceded by the Kingdom of Prussia under the terms of the Treaties of Tilsit. The duchy was held in personal union by one of Napoleon's allies, King Frederick Augustus I of Saxony.

==== Free City of Danzig (Napoleonic) ====
Prussia had acquired the City of Danzig in the course of the Second Partition of Poland in 1793. After the defeat of King Frederick William III of Prussia at the 1806 Battle of Jena–Auerstedt, according to the Franco-Prussian Treaty of Tilsit of 9 July 1807, the territory of the free state was carved out from lands that made up part of the West Prussia province.

=== 1809 ===
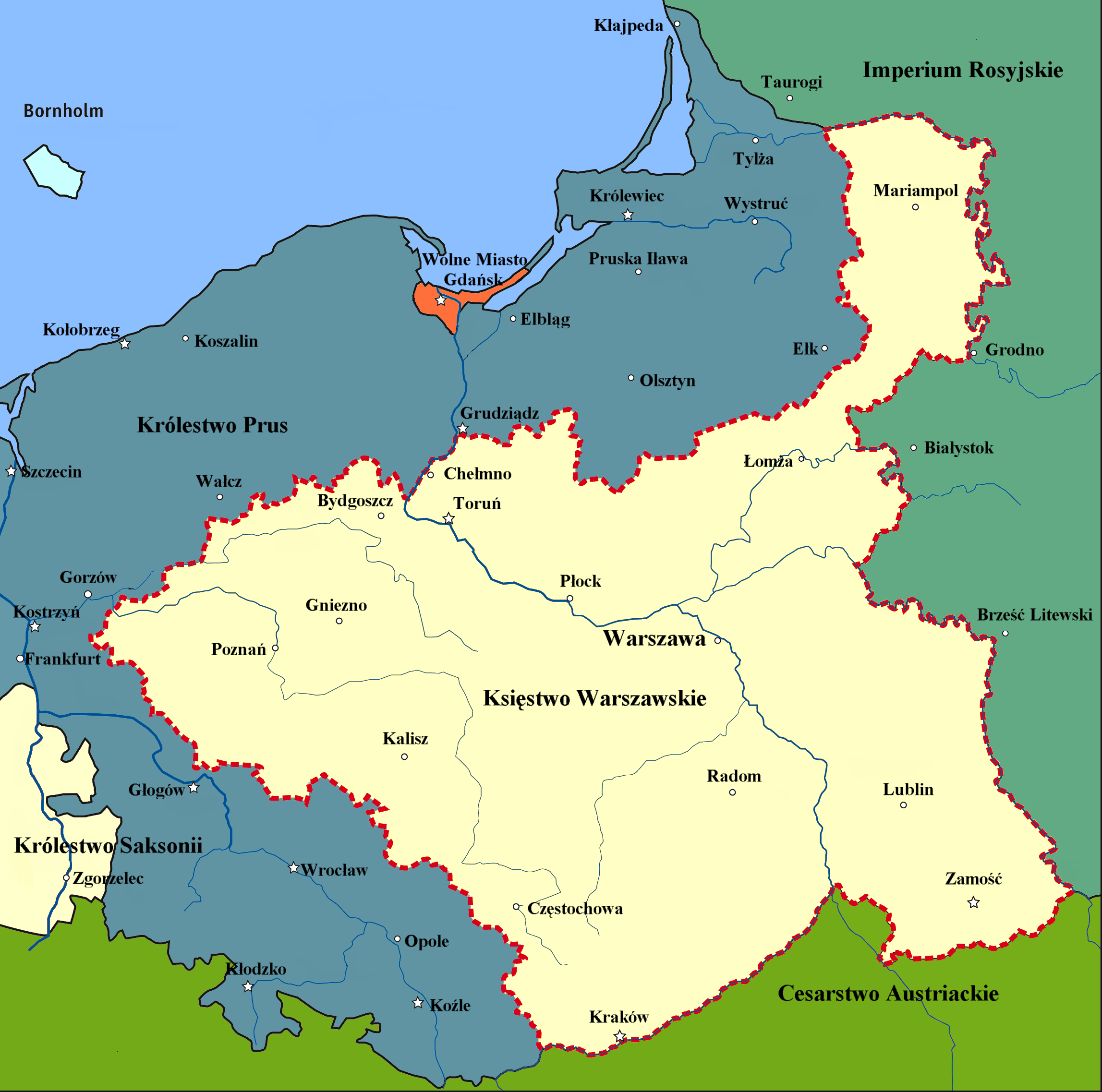

In 1809, a short war with Austria started. Although the Duchy of Warsaw won the Battle of Raszyn, Austrian troops entered Warsaw, but Duchy and French forces then outflanked their enemy and captured Kraków, Lwów and much of the areas annexed by Austria in the Partitions of Poland. After the Battle of Wagram, the ensuing Treaty of Schönbrunn allowed for a significant expansion of the Duchy's territory southwards with the regaining of once-Polish and Lithuanian lands.

=== 1815 ===
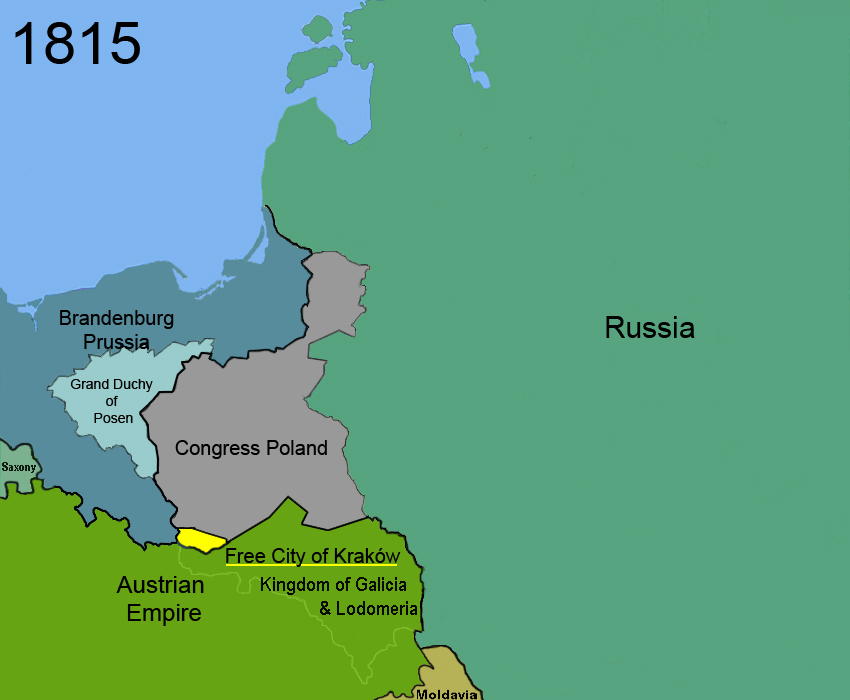

Following Napoleon's failed invasion of Russia, the duchy was occupied by Prussian and Russian troops until 1815, when it was formally partitioned between the two countries at the Congress of Vienna.

==== Congress Poland ====
Congress Poland was created out of the Duchy of Warsaw at the Congress of Vienna in 1815, when European states reorganized Europe following the Napoleonic wars.

==== Grand Duchy of Posen ====
The Grand Duchy of Posen was a region in the Kingdom of Prussia in the Polish lands commonly known as "Greater Poland" between the years 1815–1848. According to the Congress of Vienna, it was to have autonomy. In practice, it was subordinated to Prussia and the proclaimed rights for Poles were not respected. The name was unofficially used afterwards for denoting the territory, especially by Poles, and today is used by modern historians to describe different political entities until 1918. Its capital was Posen (Polish: Poznań).

==== Free City of Cracow ====
The Free, Independent, and Strictly Neutral City of Cracow with its Territory, more commonly known as either the Free City of Cracow or Republic of Cracow, was a city-state created by the Congress of Vienna in 1815.

=== 1831 ===
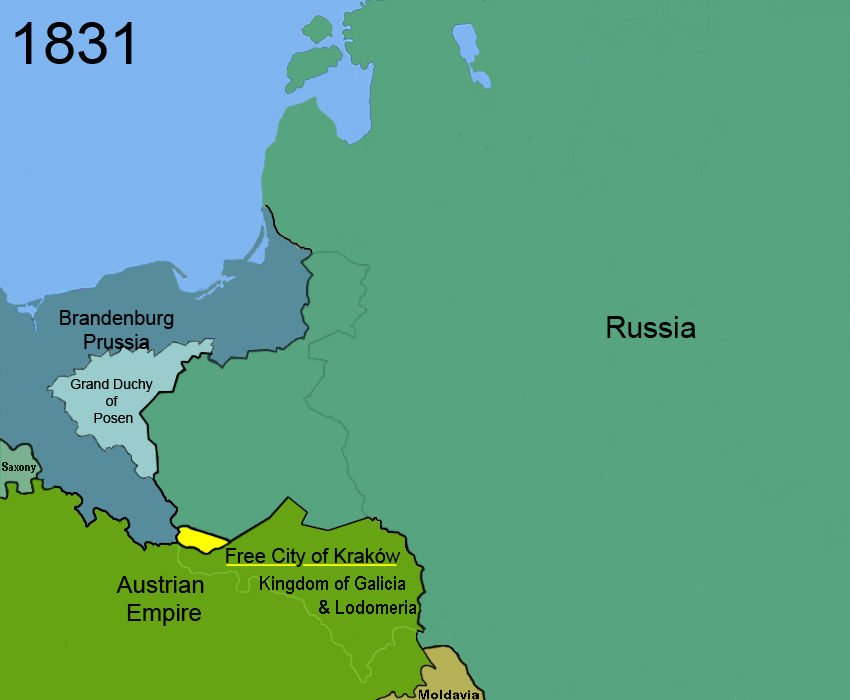

After the November Uprising, Congress Poland lost its status as a sovereign state in 1831 and the administrative division of Congress Poland was reorganized. Russia issued an "organic decree" preserving the rights of individuals in Congress Poland but abolished the Sejm. This meant Poland was subject to rule by Russian military decree.

=== 1846 ===
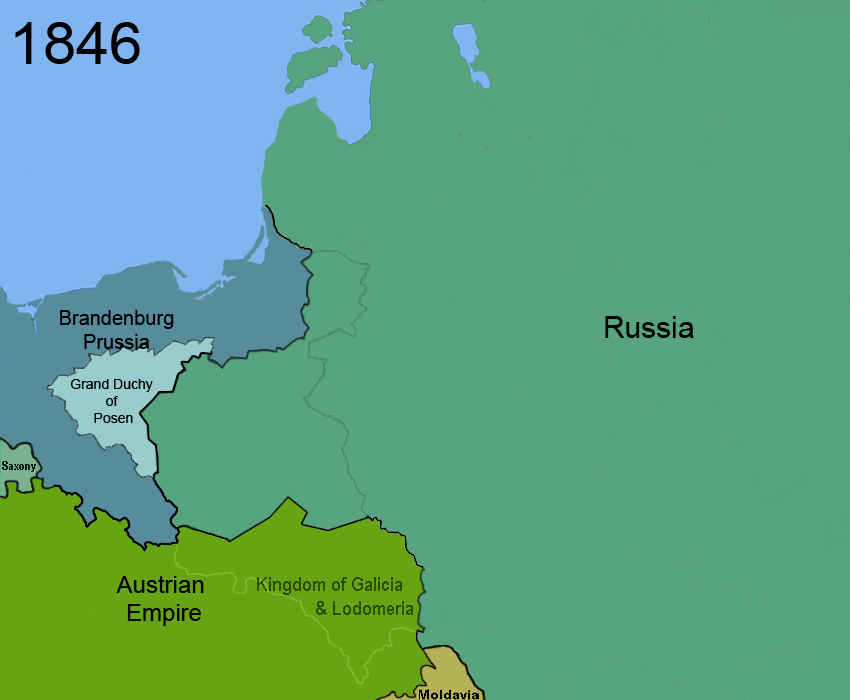

In the aftermath of the unsuccessful Kraków uprising, the Free City of Cracow was annexed by the Austrian Empire.

=== 1848 ===
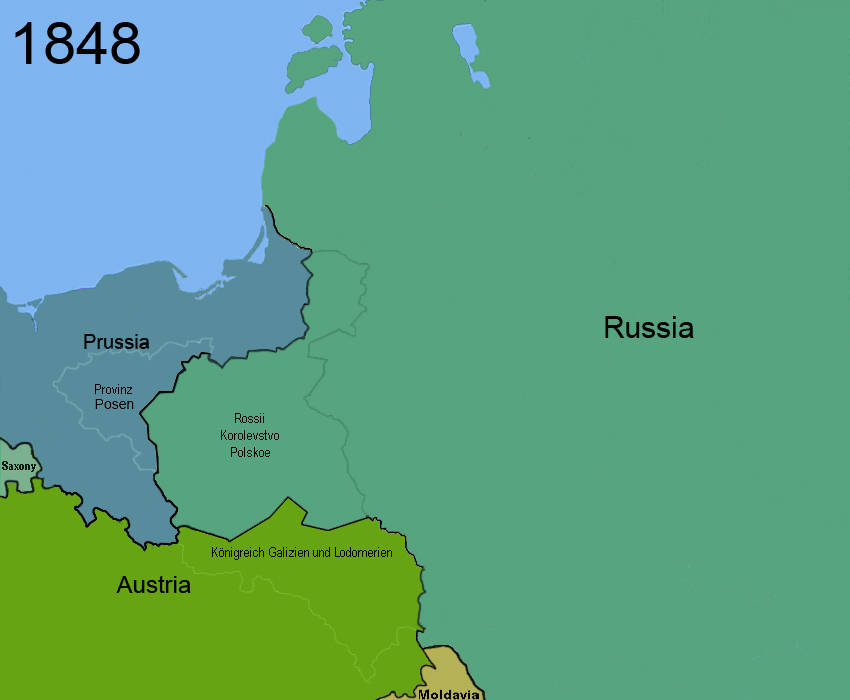

After the defeat of Congress Poland, many Prussian liberals sympathised with the demand for the restoration of the Polish state. In the spring of 1848 the new liberal Prussian government allowed some autonomy to the Grand Duchy of Posen in the hope of contributing to the cause of a new Polish homeland. Due to a number of factors, including the outrage of the German-speaking minority in Posen, the Prussian government reversed course. By April 1848, the Prussian army had already suppressed the Polish militias and National Committees that emerged in March. On 3 May 1848, Polish independence was proclaimed in Mosina, however, the small Polish republic was eventually crushed by the Prussians after their victory over the Polish insurgents at the Battle of Rogalin several days later. By the end of the year the Duchy had lost the last vestiges of its formal autonomy, and was downgraded to a Province of the Prussian kingdom.

== World War I and aftermath 1918 to 1937 ==
Territorial changes during the Second Polish Republic and the joint German-Soviet occupation of Poland, starting with the formation of the Republic and ending with the end of the occupation.

=== 1918 ===
Gradual liberation of parts of southern and central Poland in October–November 1918 (in lightgreen, lightpurple, pink and yellow)

Since the final stages of World War I in 1918, Poles, organized in various locations into the Regency Council, Polish Liquidation Committee and the Provisional People's Government of the Republic of Poland gradually liberated parts of southern and central Poland, starting with the cities of Tarnów and Kraków on October 31, and reaching the capital Warsaw on November 11. On November 10, 1918, the Polish Republic of Ostrów centered in Ostrów Wielkopolski was proclaimed in the Prussian Partition of Poland. Poland proclaimed independence on November 11.

The West Ukrainian People's Republic was proclaimed on November 1, 1918, with Lviv (Lwów) as its capital. The Ukrainian Republic claimed sovereignty over Eastern Galicia, including the Carpathians up to the city of Nowy Sącz in the west (despite the Polish majority), as well as Volhynia, Carpathian Ruthenia and Bukovina. Although the majority of the population of the Western-Ukrainian People's Republic were Ukrainians, Poles and Jews, large parts of the claimed territory were considered Polish by the Poles. In Lwów (Lviv) the Ukrainian minority supported the proclamation, the city's significant Jewish minority accepted, remained neutral or had a negative attitude towards the Ukrainian proclamation, and the Polish majority was shocked to find themselves in a proclaimed Ukrainian state. Due to the fact that Poles constituted over 60% of Lviv's inhabitants, almost 30% Jews, and Ukrainians below 10%, the vast majority of the city's inhabitants were against the fact that Lviv belonged to Ukraine and they wanted it to belong to Poland again. This sparked the Battle of Lwów (1918).

=== 1919 ===
==== Recreation of Poland ====
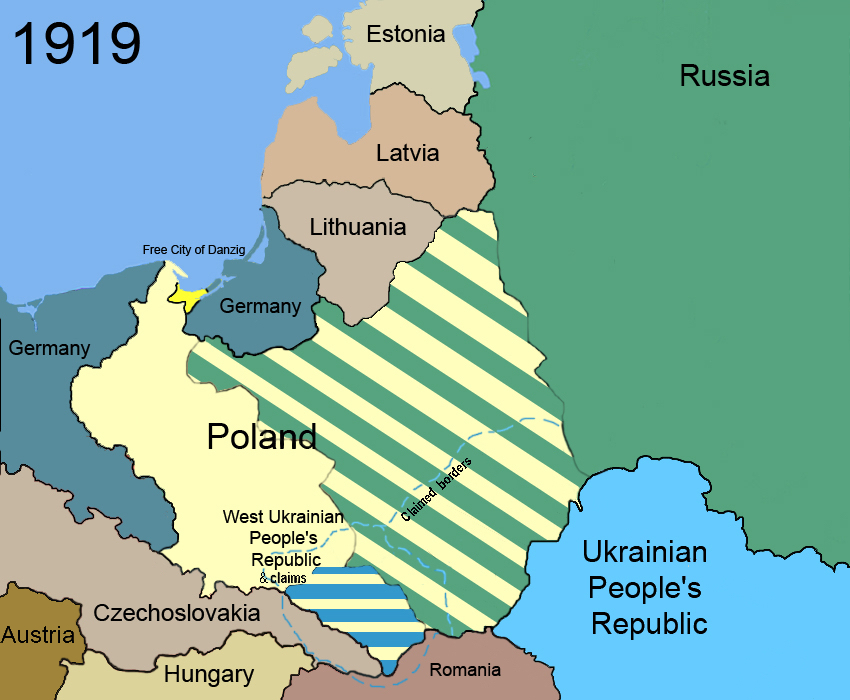
White and green stripes indicate the farthest the Russians were able to advance and the farthest the Poles were able to attack in Russia during the Polish–Soviet War. Blue and white stripes indicate fighting with the West Ukrainian People's Republic

In the aftermath of World War I, the Polish people rose up in the Greater Poland Uprising on December 27, 1918, in Poznań after a patriotic speech by Ignacy Paderewski, a famous Polish pianist. The fighting continued until June 28, 1919, when the Treaty of Versailles was signed, which recreated the nation of Poland. From the defeated German Empire, Poland received the following:

- Most of the Prussian Province of Posen was granted to Poland. This territory had already been taken over by local Polish insurgents during the Great Poland Uprising of 1918–1919.
- 70% of West Prussia (Polish Pomerania) was given to Poland to provide free access to the sea, along with a 10% German minority, creating the Polish corridor.
- The east part of Upper Silesia was awarded to Poland after a plebiscite. Sixty percent of residents voted for German citizenship, and 40 percent for Poland; as a result the area was divided.
- To provide a Polish railway line connecting Gdańsk and Warsaw, the area of Działdowo in East Prussia was granted to the new Polish state.
- From the eastern part of West Prussia and the southern part of East Prussia in the provinces of Warmia and Masuria, a small area was granted to Poland.

==== Poland seizes West Ukrainian People's Republic ====
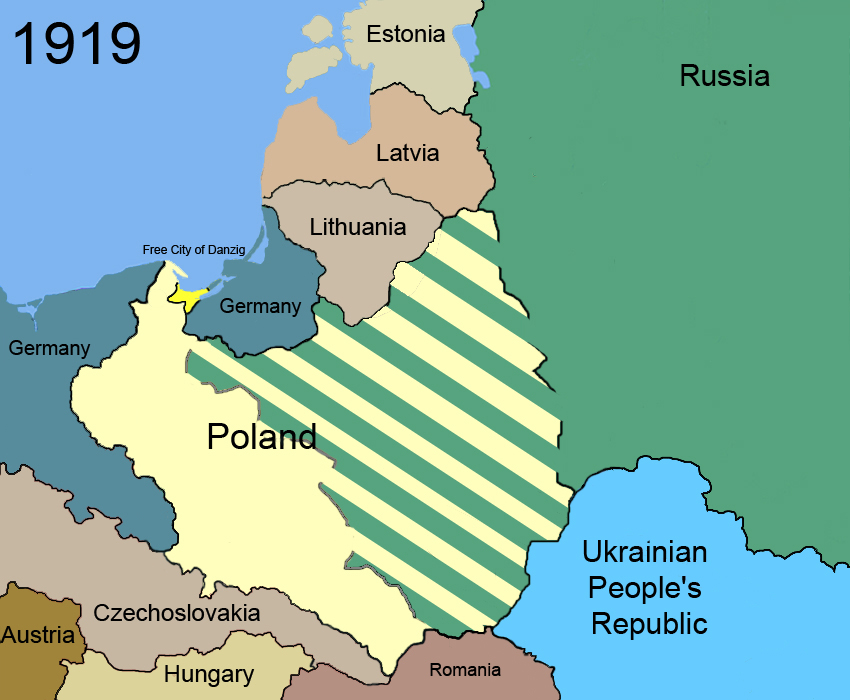
White and green stripes indicate the farthest the Russians were able to advance and the farthest the Poles were able to attack into Russia during the Polish–Soviet War

On July 17, 1919, a ceasefire was signed in the Polish–Ukrainian War with the West Ukrainian People's Republic (ZUNR). As part of the agreement Poland kept ZUNR territory. The West Ukrainian People's Republic then merged with the Ukrainian People's Republic (UNR). On June 25, 1919, Supreme Allies Council transferred East Galicia (ZUNR territory) to Poland.

==== Polish–Soviet War ====
The Polish–Soviet War (February 1919 – March 1921) was an armed conflict between Soviet Russia and Soviet Ukraine on the one hand and the Second Polish Republic and the short-lived Ukrainian People's Republic on the other. The war was the result of conflicting expansionist ambitions. Poland, whose statehood had just been re-established by the Treaty of Versailles following the Partitions of Poland in the late 18th century, sought to secure territories it had lost at the time of the partitions. The aim of the Soviet states was to control those same territories, which the Russian Empire had gained in the partitions of Poland.

March 1919

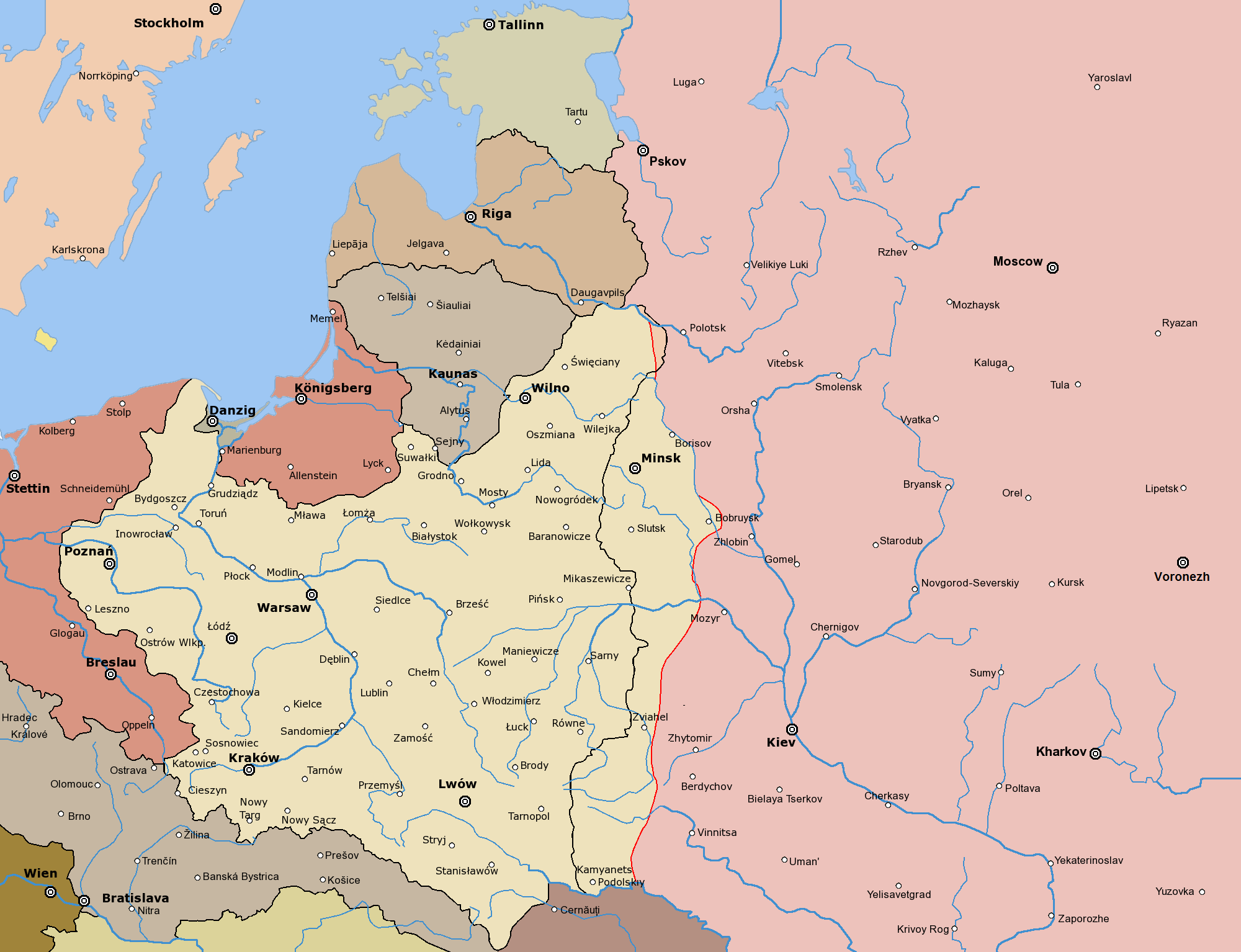
December 1919

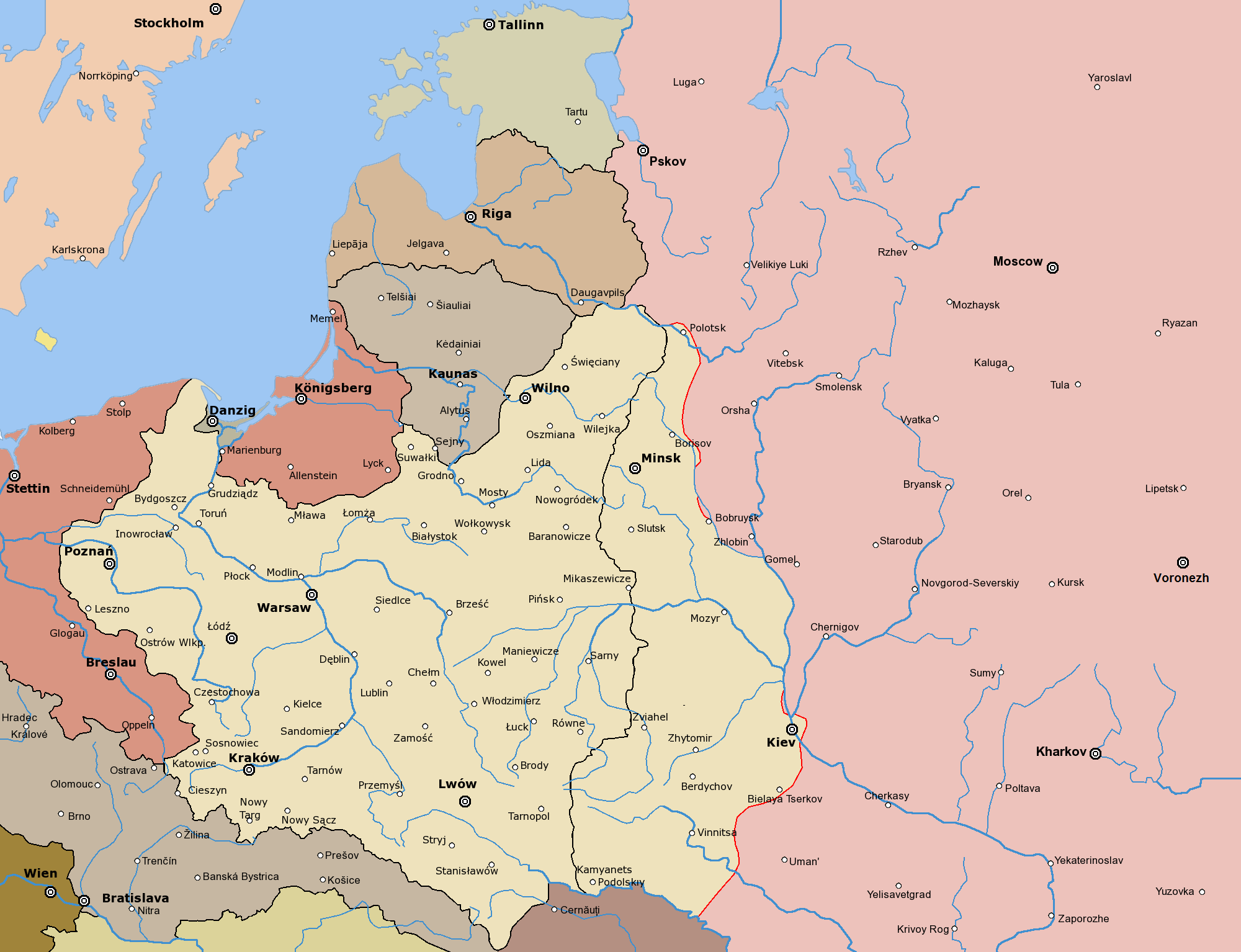
June 1920

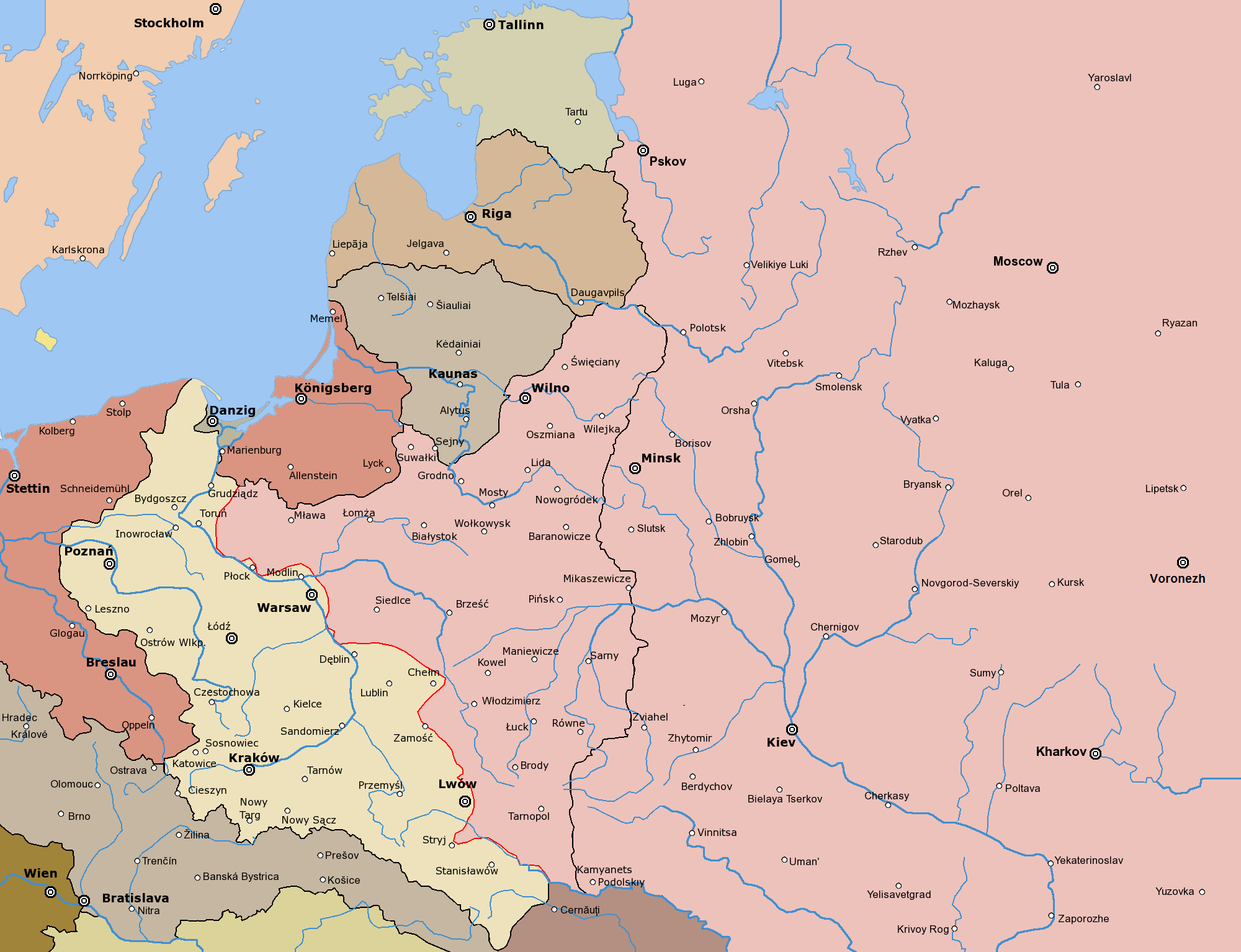
August 1920

Treaty of Riga

=== 1920 ===
==== Free City of Danzig ====
The Free City of Danzig (Gdańsk) was created on 15 November 1920 in accordance with the terms of Article 100 (Section XI of Part III) of the 1919 Treaty of Versailles. As the Treaty stated, the region was to remain separated from Germany and from Poland, but it was not an independent state. The Free City was under League of Nations protection and put into a binding customs union with Poland.

Poland was given full rights to develop and maintain transportation, communication, and port facilities in the city. The Free City was created in order to give Poland access to a good-sized seaport.

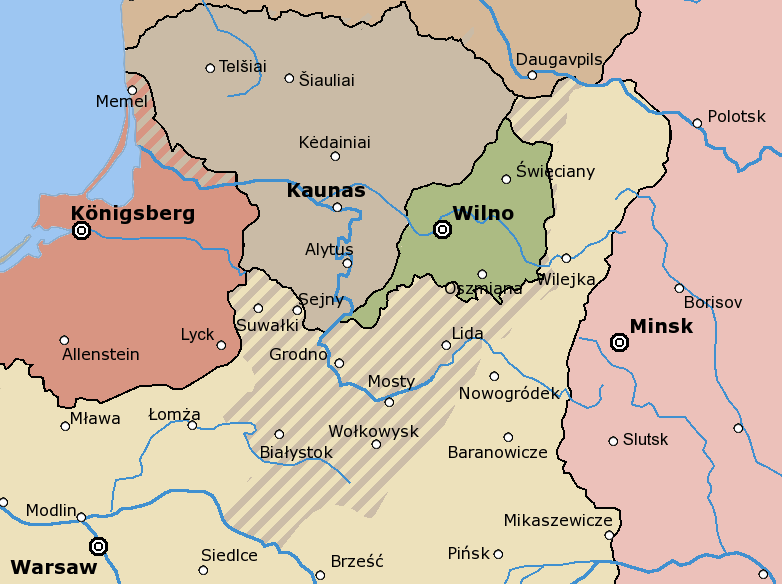
Lithuanian land claims

==== Polish–Lithuanian War ====
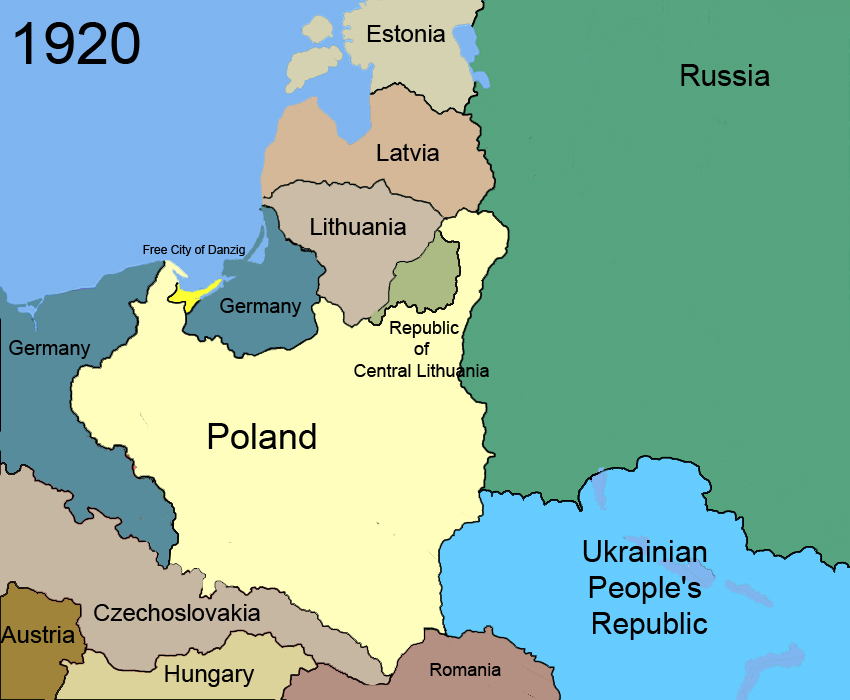
Russian border shown though Treaty of Riga not signed

The Polish–Lithuanian War was an armed conflict between Lithuania and the Second Polish Republic, lasting from August 1920 to October 7, 1920, in the aftermath of World War I, not long after both countries had regained their independence. It was part of a wider conflict over disputed territorial control of the cities of Vilnius (Polish: Wilno), Suwałki (Lithuanian: Suvalkai) and Augustów (Lithuanian: Augustavas).

In the aftermath of the war the Republic of Central Lithuania was created in 1920 following the staged rebellion of soldiers of the 1st Lithuanian-Belarusian Infantry Division of the Polish Army, supported by the Polish air force, cavalry and artillery. Centered on the historical capital of the Grand Duchy of Lithuania, Vilna (Lithuanian: Vilnius, Polish: Wilno), for eighteen months the entity served as a buffer state between Poland, upon which it depended, and Lithuania, which claimed the area.

==== Negotiations with Russia ====
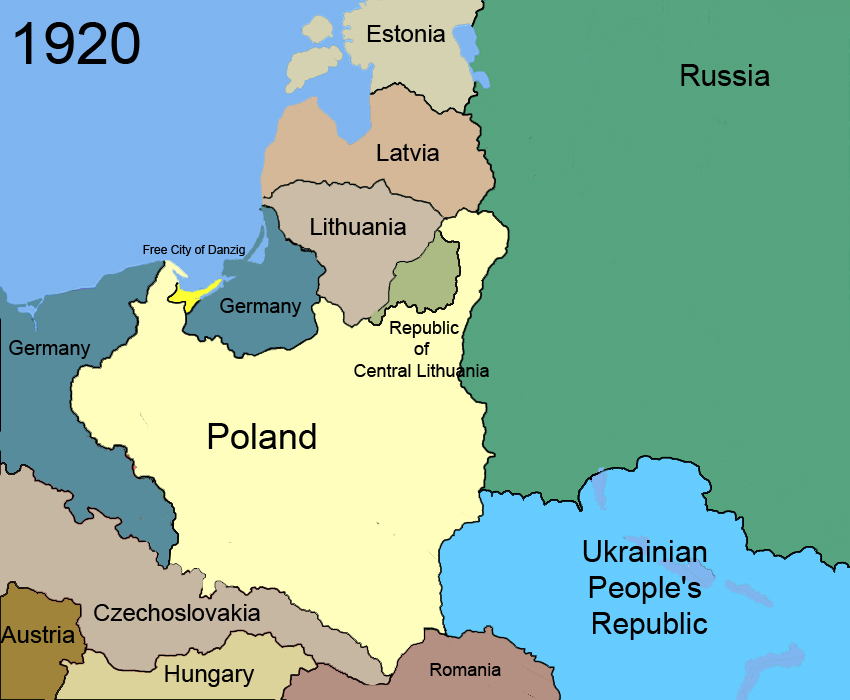
Russian-Polish border agreed to on 18 October 1920.

Soon after the Battle of Warsaw the Bolsheviks sued for peace. The Poles, exhausted, constantly pressured by the Western governments and the League of Nations, and with its army controlling the majority of the disputed territories, were willing to negotiate. The Soviets made two offers: one on September 21 and the other on September 28. The Polish delegation made a counteroffer on October 2. On October 5, the Soviets offered amendments to the Polish offer, which Poland accepted. The armistice between Poland on the one side and Soviet Ukraine and Soviet Russia on the other was signed on October 12 and went into effect on October 18. Long negotiations ensued, with the Treaty of Riga being signed in March 1921. The assessment of relative advantage is not universally agreed. Outcome assessments vary, mostly between calling the result a Polish victory and being inconclusive, with the latter mostly by Soviet-era Russian historians. However, in his secret report to the 9th Conference of the Bolshevik Party on 20 September 1920, Lenin called the outcome of the war "In a word, a gigantic, unheard-of defeat", considering he wanted to reach the German communist revolutionaries to aid them and establish a socialist marxist republic there.

==== Negotiations with Czechoslovakia ====
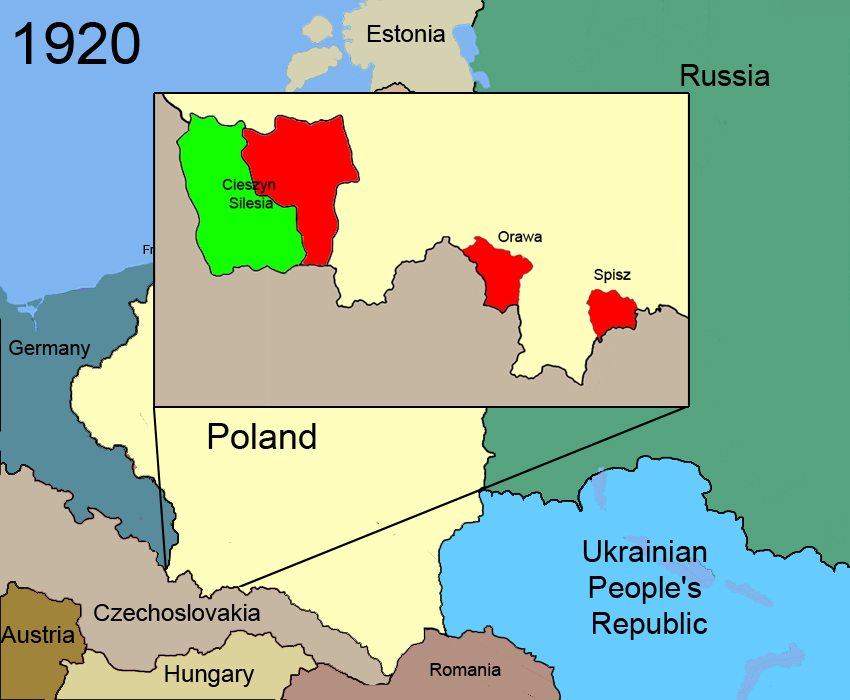
Territory adjustments between Czechoslovakia (green) and Poland (red).

During the closing years of World War I Polish and Czechoslovak diplomats met to arrange a common border between the two new countries. By the time armistice was declared, most of the border was agreed except for three small politically and economically sensitive areas with both Polish and Czechoslovak residents: Cieszyn, Orawa, and Spisz.

The Duchy of Cieszyn

The Cieszyn Silesia or the Duchy of Cieszyn (Czech: Tesin) was a small area that the pre-World War I census showed was predominantly Polish in three districts (Cieszyn, Bielsko and Frysztat) and mainly Czech in the fourth district of Frydek. The economic importance of Cieszyn Silesia lay in the rich coal basin around Karvina and in the valuable Košice–Bohumín Railway, which linked Bohemia with Slovakia. In northern Cieszyn Silesia, the railroad junction of Bohumín (Czech: Bohumin) served as a crossroads for international transport and communications.

Claims over these regions turned violent in 1919 with a brief military conflict, the Seven-day war, between Polish and Czechoslovak units. The Allied governments pressed for a ceasefire and on 3 February 1919 a Polish–Czech border agreement was signed on the basis of the 5 November 1918 ethnic division agreement. This was later changed at the Conference of Ambassadors in Spa, Belgium on 28 July 1920. Cieszyn was divided along the Olza river between the two newly created states of Poland and Czechoslovakia. The smaller western suburbs of Cieszyn were joined to Czechoslovakia as the new town of Český Těšín along with the railroad and the Karvina coal basin. Poland received the portion of Cieszyn east of the Olza river. The Conference of Ambassadors divided the region just as the Red Army was nearing Warsaw.

Orawa and Spisz

The county of Orawa (Slovak: Orava) arose before the 15th century. The county's territory is situated along the Orava River between Zazriva and the Tatra Mountains. Spisz (Slovak: Spiš) is situated between the High Tatras and the Dunajec River in the north, the springs of the Váh River in the west, the Slovak Ore Mountains and the Hnilec River in the south, and a line running from the town of Stara Ľubovňa, via the Branisko Mountains, to the town of Margecany in the east. While the Orawa and Spisz border was in arbitration, many groups fought to be a part of Poland, including a number of Polish authors. They began to write about an alleged three hundred thousand Poles living in the Orawa territory.

The Conference of Ambassadors decided that Czechoslovakia would cede to Poland a number of villages from the Orawa and Spisz regions, including the municipalities of Oravy Srnie, Podvlk, Harkabúz, Nižná Zubrica, Vyšná Zubrica, Oravka, Bukovina-Podsklie, Pekelník, Jablonka, Chyžné, Hladovka, Suchá Hora, Vyšná Lipnica, a part of Nižné Lipnice and 4.2% of the rather Belá new communities, with Fridman (Falštin settlement), Krempach, Tribš, Durštín, Čierna Hora, Jurgov, Repiská, Vyšné lapse, Nižné lapse, Nedeca, Kacvín and Lapšanka.

=== 1921 ===
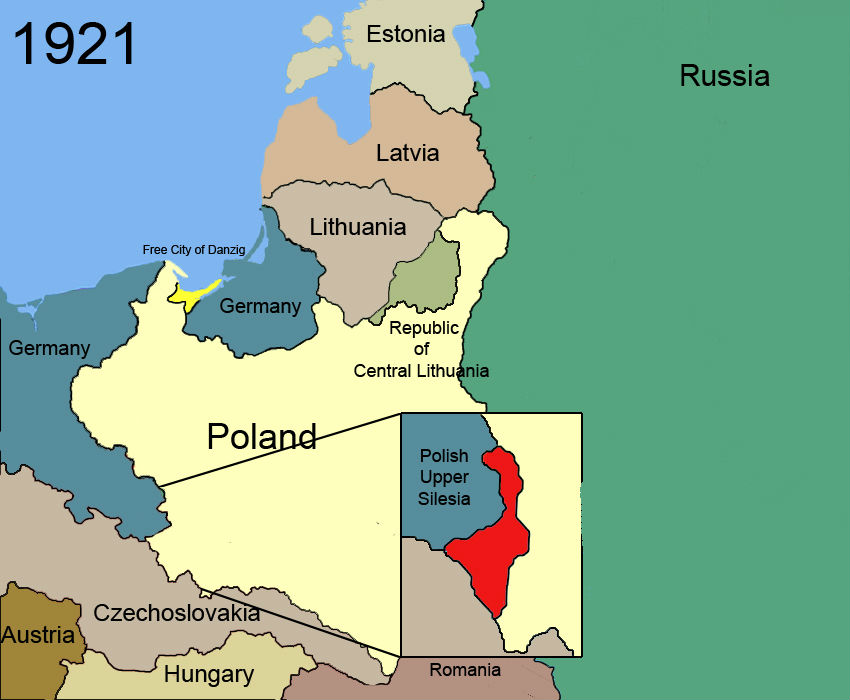
Upper Silesian industrial district (red) to Poland after the Upper Silesia plebiscite in 1921

In late 1921 a border adjustment between the Weimar Republic and Poland took place as a result of the Silesian Uprisings. The uprisings were a series of three armed rebellions that took place between 1919 and 1921 by the Polish people in the Upper Silesia region against the Weimar Republic. The Polish people of the region wanted to join the Second Polish Republic, which had been established following World War I. The 1919 Treaty of Versailles had called for a plebiscite in Upper Silesia in 1921 to determine whether the territory should be a part of Germany or Poland.

The plebiscite took place on March 20, 1921, two days after the signing of the Treaty of Riga, which ended the Polish–Soviet War. In the plebiscite, 707,605 votes were cast for Germany, and 479,359 for Poland. The Germans had a majority, by 228,246 votes. In late April 1921, rumours flew that Upper Silesia would stay in Germany. This led to the Third Polish Uprising in May–July 1921. The question of the Upper Silesia problem was turned over to a council of the League of Nations. The commission, consisting of four representatives—one each from Belgium, Brazil, Spain, and China. The commission gathered its own data, interviewing Poles and Germans from the region. On the basis of the reports of this commission and those of its experts, in October 1921 the Council awarded the greater part of the Upper Silesian industrial district to Poland.

=== 1922 ===
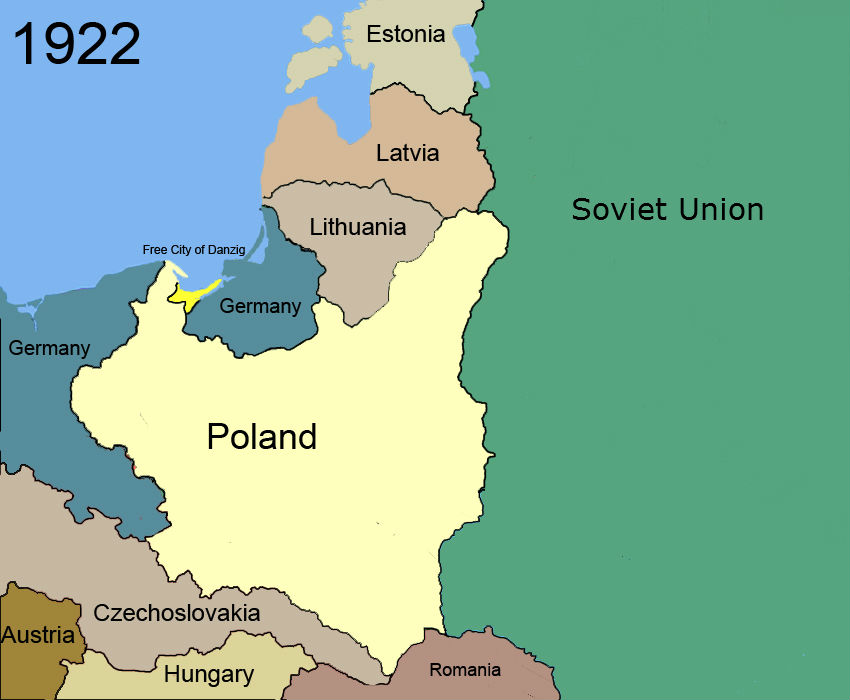

After a variety of delays, a disputed election to join Poland took place on January 8, 1922, and the Republic of Central Lithuania became part of Poland, finalizing the geography of Poland's eastern Kresy region until the Invasion of Poland in 1939.

=== 1924 ===
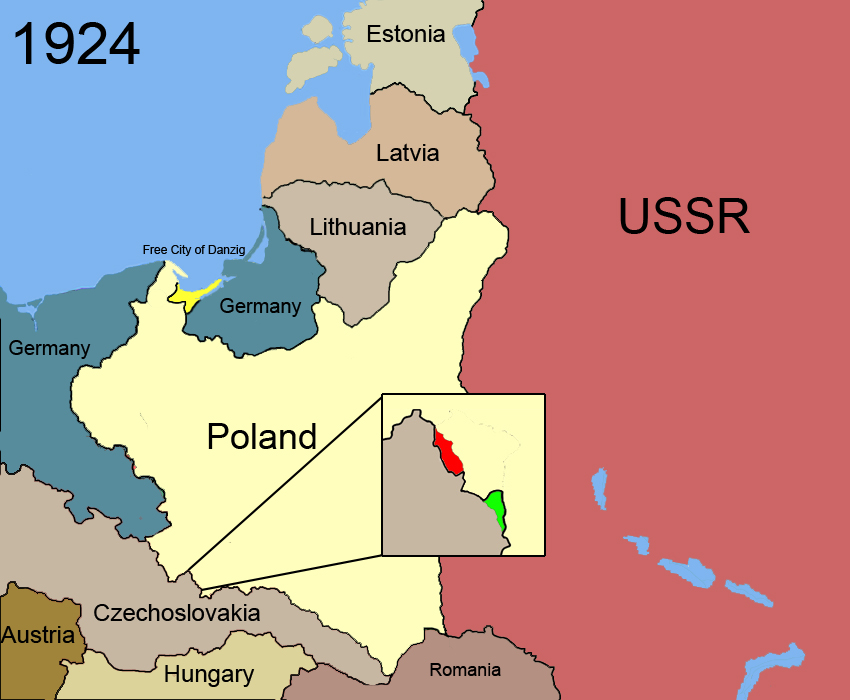
Lipnica Wielka (red) went to Poland and Suchá Hora and Hladovka (green) went to Czechoslovakia.

The Polish government was not satisfied with the Czechoslovakia-Polish border decided from the Paris Peace Conference or from the Conference of Ambassadors. The conflict was only resolved by the Council of the League of Nations' Permanent Court of International Justice on March 12, 1924, which decided that Czechoslovakia should retain the territory of Javorzyna. and which entailed (in June of the same year) an additional exchange of territories in Orava – the territory around Lipnica Wielka (Nižná Lipnica) went to Poland, the territory around Suchá Hora (Sucha Góra) and Hladovka (Głodówka) went to Czechoslovakia.

== World War II 1938 to 1945 ==
=== 1938 ===
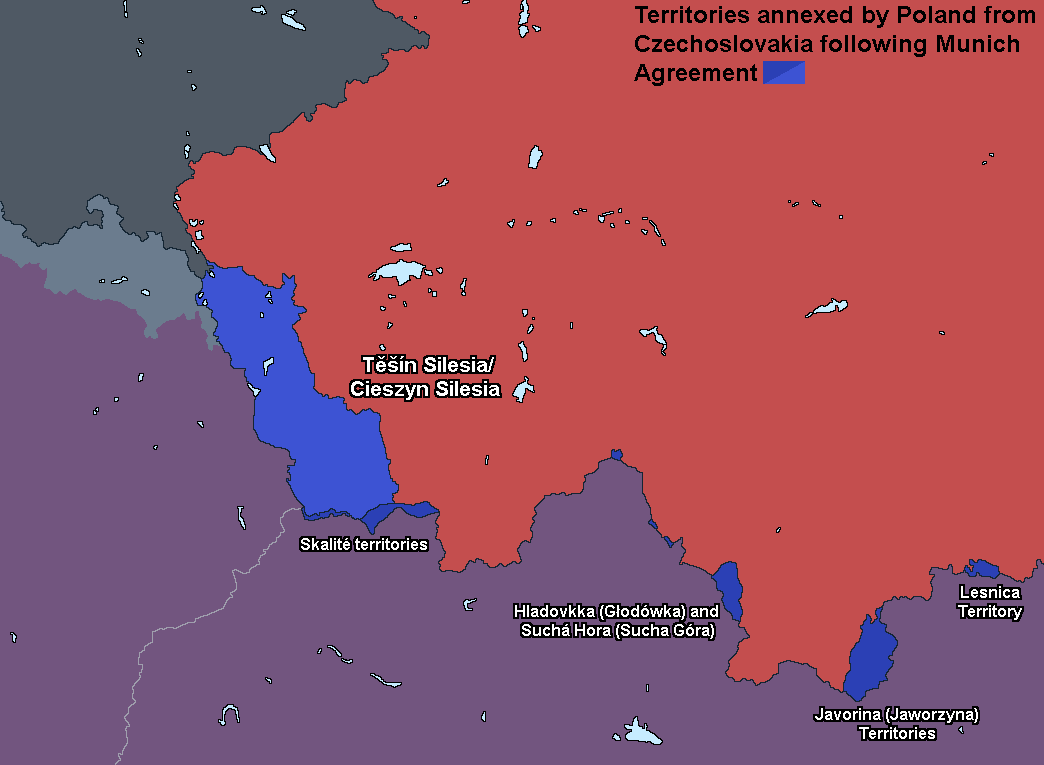
Territories in lighter blue seized by Poland from the Czech part of Czechoslovakia, territories in dark blue seized by Poland from the Slovak part of Czechoslovakia.

As Czechoslovakia was being absorbed into the German Reich, Trans-Olza, the Czech half of Cieszyn, was annexed by Poland in 1938 following the Munich Agreement and the First Vienna Award. At noon on September 30, Poland gave an ultimatum to the Czechoslovak government. It demanded the immediate evacuation of Czech troops and police from Trans-Olza and gave Prague until noon the following day. At 11:45 a.m. on October 1 the Czech foreign ministry called the Polish ambassador in Prague and told him that Poland could have what it wanted. Poland was accused of being an accomplice of Nazi Germany.

The dismemberment of Czechoslovakia

Poland seized land from northern Spisz and northern Orawa, including territories around Suchá Hora and Hladovka, around Javorina, around Leśnica in the Pieniny Mountains, a small territory around Skalité, and some other very small border regions. They officially received the territories on 1 November 1938. Polish military groups began to carry out assimilation of the population. Polish was introduced as the only official language and the Slovak Intelligence were displaced from the territories.

=== 1939 ===
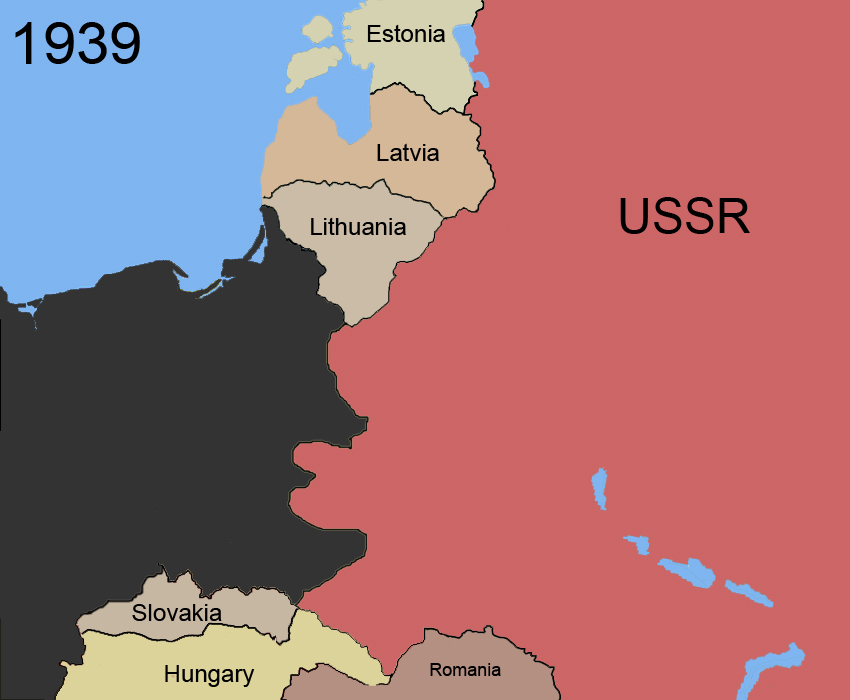

USSR and Nazi Germany carve up Poland

In 1939, Germany and the Soviet Union invaded Poland and partitioned it pursuant to the Molotov–Ribbentrop Pact.

After the invasion, Germany annexed the lands it lost to reformed Poland in 1919–1922 by the Treaty of Versailles: the Polish Corridor, West Prussia, the Province of Posen, and parts of eastern Upper Silesia. The council of the Free City of Danzig voted to become a part of Germany again, although Poles and Jews were deprived of their voting rights and all non-Nazi political parties were banned. Parts of Poland that had not been part of Wilhelmine Germany were also incorporated into the Reich.

Two decrees by Adolf Hitler (October 8 and October 12, 1939) provided for the division of the annexed areas of Poland into the following administrative units:

- Reichsgau Wartheland (initially Reichsgau Posen), which included the entire Poznań Voivodeship, most of the Łódź Voivodeship, five counties of the Pomeranian Voivodeship, and one county of the Warszawa Voivodeship;
- Reichsgau Danzig-West Prussia (initially Reichsgau West Prussia), which consisted of the remaining area of the Pomeranian Voivodeship and the Free City of Danzig;
- Ciechanów District (Regierungsbezirk Zichenau), consisting of the five northern counties of Warszawa Voivodeship (Płock, Płońsk, Sierpc, Ciechanów, and Mława), which became a part of East Prussia;
- Katowice District (Regierungsbezirk Kattowitz), or unofficially East Upper Silesia (Ost-Oberschlesien), which included Sosnowiec, Będzin, Chrzanów, and Zawiercie Counties, and parts of Olkusz and Żywiec Counties.

These territories had an area of 94,000 square kilometres (36,000 sq mi) and a population of 10,000,000 people. The remaining Polish territory was annexed by the Soviet Union or made into the German-controlled General Government occupation zone. Eastern areas of Poland became part of either Soviet Belarus (including Białystok, Łomża, Baranowicze and Brest) or Soviet Ukraine (including Lwów, Tarnopol, Lutsk, Rowne and Stanisławów). The city of Vilnius (Polish: Wilno) with its adjacent area was seized by the Soviet Union and returned to Lithuania.

=== 1941 ===
After the German attack on the Soviet Union in June 1941, the district of Białystok, which included the Białystok, Bielsk Podlaski, Grajewo, Łomża, Sokółka, Volkovysk, and Grodno Counties, was "attached to" (not incorporated into) East Prussia. The former Lwow, Stanislawow and Tarnopol Voivodeships were annexed to the General Government, forming its fifth district, Distrikt Galizien.

=== 1945 ===
At the end of World War II, the Allies formally accepted the unconditional surrender of Nazi Germany. There were extensive changes to the territorial extent of Poland, following the decision taken at the Tehran Conference of 1943 at the insistence of the Soviet Union. The Polish territories east of the Curzon Line (known as the Kresy), which the Soviet Union had occupied in 1939 along with the Bialystok region were permanently annexed, resulting in Poland losing over 20% of its pre-war borders. While a large portion of this area was predominately populated by Ukrainians and Belarusians, most of their Polish inhabitants were expelled. Today these territories are part of Belarus, Ukraine and Lithuania.

Poland received former German territory east of the Oder–Neisse line, which it previously lost in the Partitions of Poland or earlier, consisting of the southern two thirds of East Prussia, most of Pomerania and Silesia, right-bank Lubusz Land and Lusatia, and northern and western outskirts of Greater Poland. Poland also received the town of Swinemünde (now Świnoujście) on the island of Usedom and the city of Stettin (now Szczecin) on the western bank of the Oder river in accordance with the Potsdam Agreement. The German population was expelled in accordance with the agreement and these territories were repopulated mainly with Poles from central Poland and those expelled from the eastern regions. Early expulsions in Poland were undertaken by the occupying Soviet and Polish Communist military authorities even before the Potsdam Conference ("wild expulsions"). The new borders between the two post-war German states and Poland were later reaffirmed in the Treaty of Zgorzelec with East Germany (1950) and in the Treaty of Warsaw (1970) with West Germany.

Poland's borders after World War II. Blue line: Curzon Line of 8 December 1919. Pink areas: Parts of Germany in 1937 borders. Grey area: Territory annexed by Poland between 1919 and 1923 and held until 1939, which after World War II was annexed by the Soviet Union.

Planned and actual divisions of Europe, according to the Molotov–Ribbentrop Pact, with later adjustments

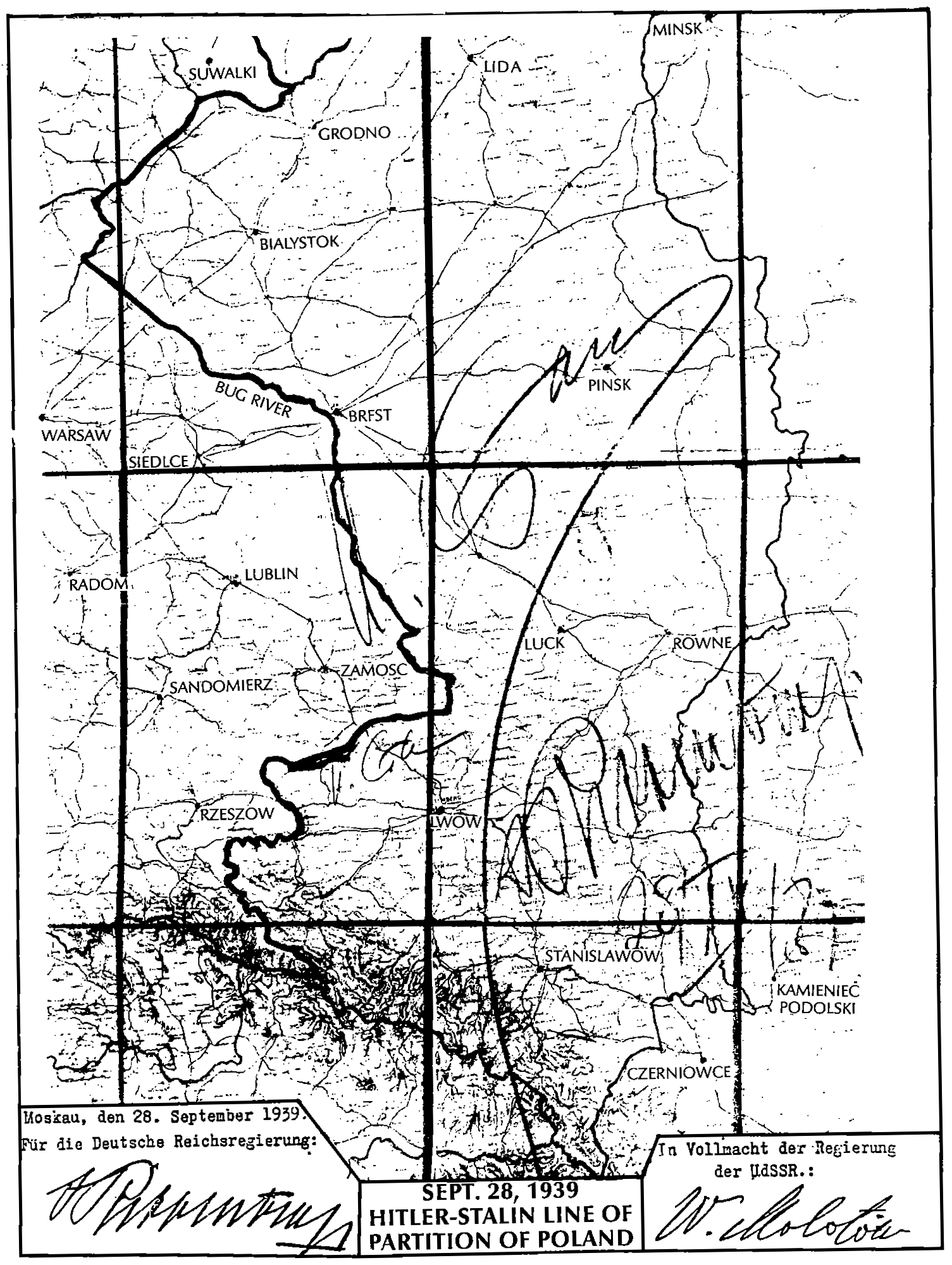
Molotov–Ribbentrop Pact showing the new German-Soviet border Sept 28 1939

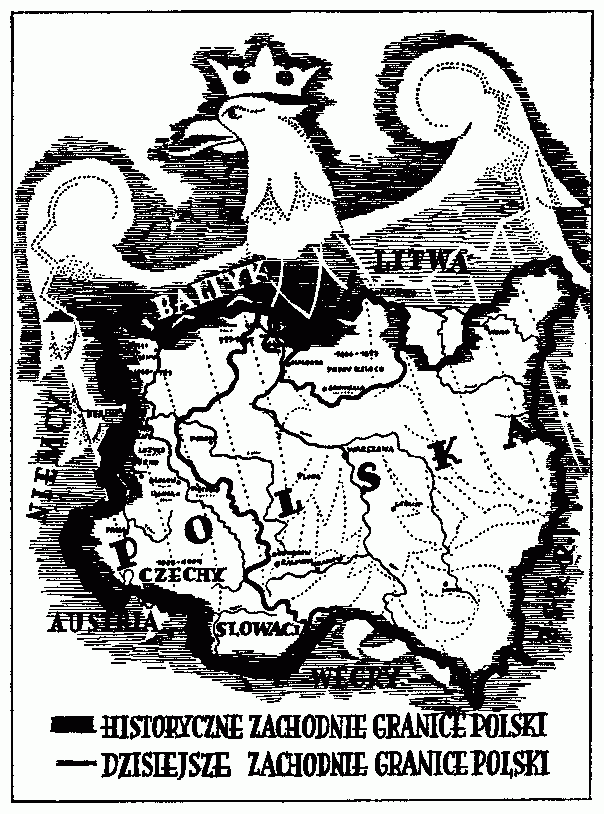
Historical Western Borders of Poland. Polish poster from interwar period

==== Polish-Soviet border changes ====
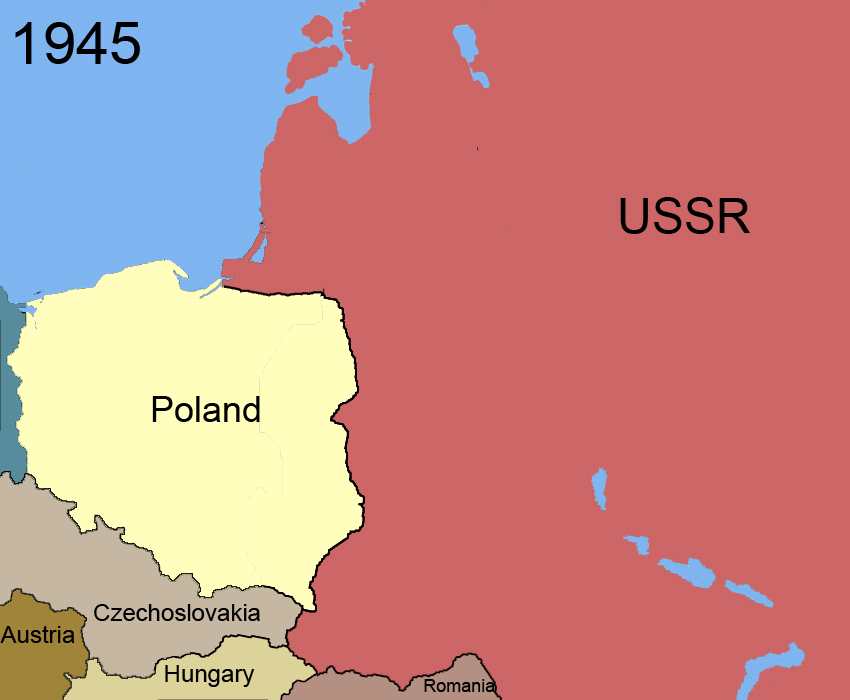
Border adjustment between Poland and the USSR on 16 August 1945.

A map of modern Ukraine showing lands annexed from Poland during World War II

On August 16, 1945, a border agreement between Poland and the USSR was signed. The western portion of the Byelorussian SSR was restored to Poland. The Belastok Region was divided into Soviet Brest Region, Grodno Region and Polish Białystok Voivodeship.

Initially, at the end of World War II in 1945, Poland also gained control of the current southern border strip of the Kaliningrad Oblast, with Polish administration organized in the towns of Gierdawy and Iławka, however, the area was eventually annexed by the Soviet Union and included within the Kaliningrad Oblast by December 1945.

As a result, Poland lost about 178,000 square kilometres (69,000 square miles) of its pre-war territory in the east, but gained some 101,000 square kilometres (39,000 square miles) in the west and north.

==== Czechoslovakia ====
After the Second World War the Czechoslovak government wanted to return to the 1920 border between the two nations, while Polish inhabitants of Trans-Olza were in favour of the boundary of August 31, 1939. On May 20, 1945, in Trstena an agreement for a return to the 1938 borders of Poland was signed and the following day the Czechoslovak border guards moved to the old Czechoslovak border. At several places there were fights between Polish and Czechoslovak militias, but the situation calmed with the arrival of Polish troops on July 17, 1945. The Polish government still did not want to give up Trans-Olza, and on June 16, 1945, Marshall Michał Rola-Żymierski issued directive number 00336, which ordered the 1st Armoured Corps of the Polish Army to concentrate in the area of Prudnik, Rybnik and Cieszyn, and to seize Trans-Olza. However, the Soviets decided to hand the region to Czechoslovakia, and the Poles followed the Moscow directive. The Czechs demanded former German areas of Kłodzko, Głubczyce, and Racibórz, but after Soviet mediation, all sides signed a treaty on September 21, 1945, which accepted the December 31, 1937, Polish–Czechoslovak and Czechoslovak–German borderline as the boundary between the two countries.

== Minor changes since 1946 ==
Territorial changes during the Polish People's Republic and modern Third Polish Republic, since the end of World War II.

=== 1948 ===
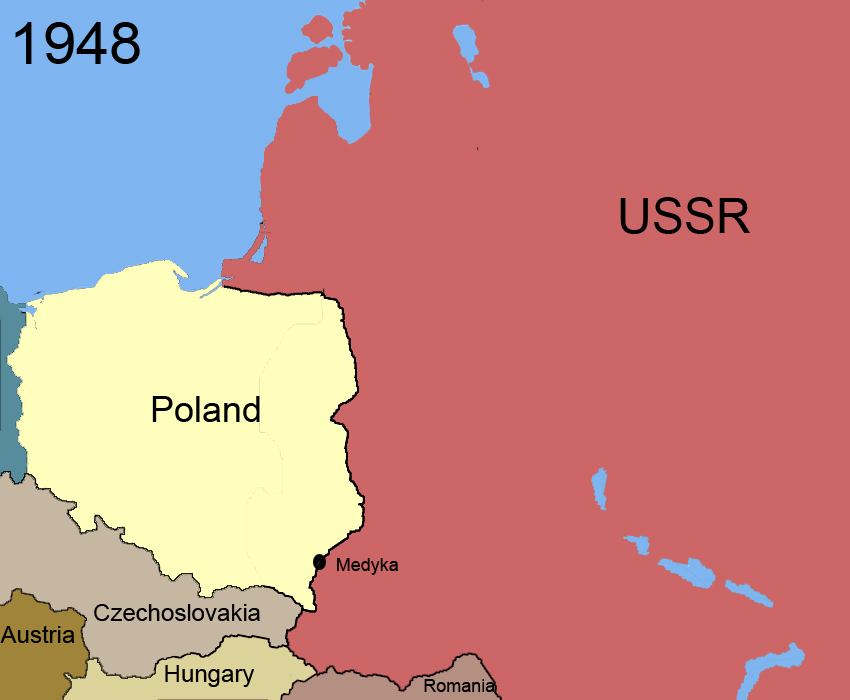
The village of Medyka near Przemyśl was transferred to Poland.

The Polish border underwent a minor correction in 1948, when the village of Medyka near Przemyśl was transferred to Poland.

=== 1949 ===
In 1949, there was modest exchange of territory between the Polish People's Republic and the German Democratic Republic (GDR). What is now the B 104/B 113 road junction at Linken, Mecklenburg-Western Pomerania to the immediate west of the Polish town of Lubieszyn was transferred from Poland to the GDR in return for a narrow strip of land lying directly on the west side of the road that connected the settlements of Linki and Buk. This move necessitated the creation of a new road linking Lubieszyn to Linki and Buk that mirrored the new shape of the border.

=== 1951 ===
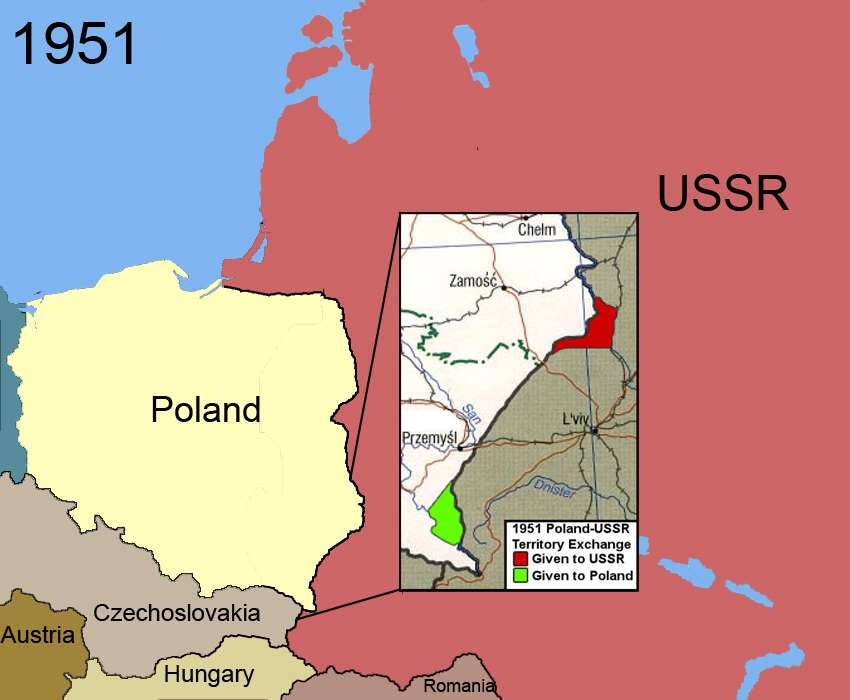

On February 15, 1951 Aleksander Zawadzki (acting in the name of the President of the Polish Republic) and Andrey Vyshinsky (acting in the name of the Presidium of the Supreme Soviet of the Union of Soviet Socialist Republics) signed Treaty No. 6222. Agreement between the Polish Republic and the Union of Soviet Socialist Republics concerning the exchange of sectors of their state territories. The treaty was a border adjustment, with Poland and the Soviet Union exchanging 480 square kilometres (190 sq mi).

In 1951, a small area of land on Usedom Island (Polish: Uznam) was ceded from the German Democratic Republic (Eastern Germany) to Poland. The water pumping station for Świnoujście lies on that land and was therefore handed over to Poland. In return, a similarly-sized area north of Mescherin, including the village of Staffelde (Polish: Staw), was transferred from Poland to the German Democratic Republic.

=== 1958 ===
On June 13, 1958, the Agreement concerning the final demarcation of the state frontier between Czechoslovakia and Poland was signed in Warsaw. Adam Rapacki signed for Poland and Václav David signed for Czechoslovakia. The treaty confirmed the border at the line of January 1, 1938, the situation before the Nazi-imposed Munich Agreement transferred territory from Czechoslovakia to Poland.

=== 1968 ===
East Germany and Poland signed a treaty for the Baltic continental shelf delimitation.

=== 1975 ===
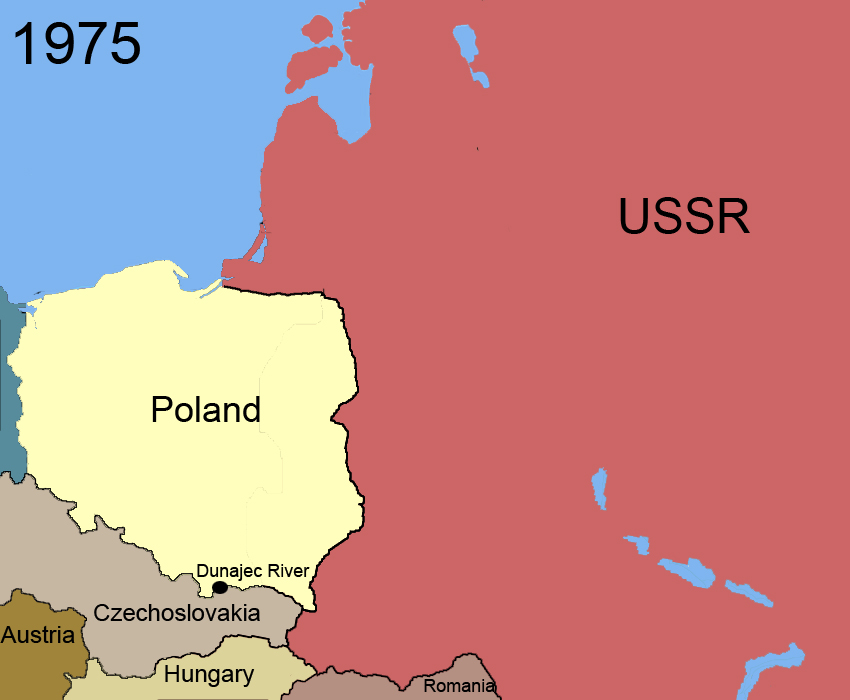
Territorial changes along the Dunajec river 1975

In March 1975 Czechoslovakia and Poland modified their border along the Dunajec to permit Poland to construct a dam in the Czorsztyn region, southeast of Krakow.

=== 1989 ===
On May 22, 1989, East Germany and Poland completed the delimitation of their territorial waters in the Gulf of Szczecin.

=== 2002 ===
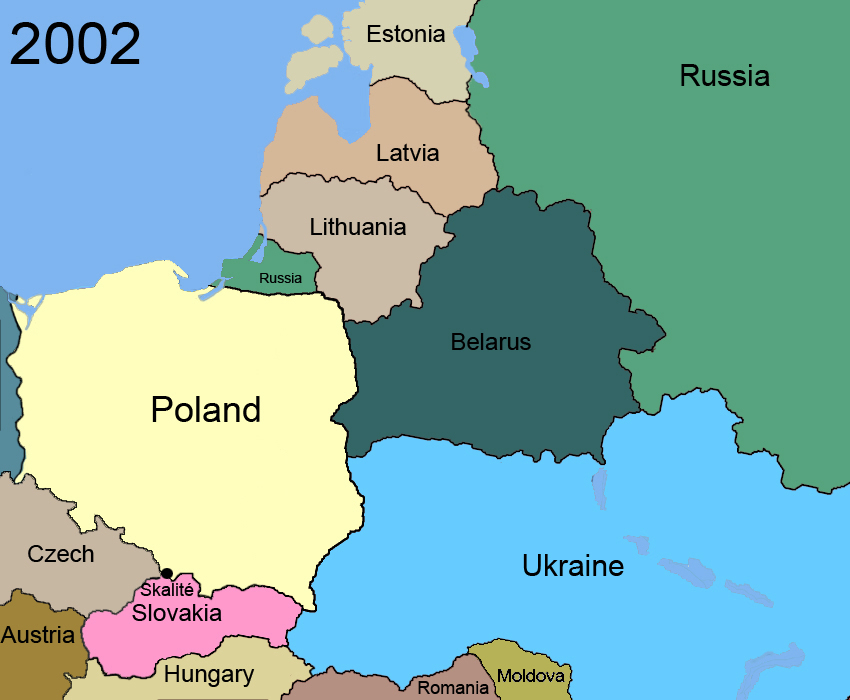
Territorial changes between Poland and Slovakia in 2002

In 2002, Poland and Slovakia made some further minor border adjustments:

Territory of the Republic of Poland with a total area of 2,969 m^{2} (31,958.05 sq ft), including:

a) in the area of a viewing tower on the surface of the saddle Dukielskie about 376 m^{2}, according to documents limit referred to in Article 1, paragraph 2

b) on the nameless island with an area of 2,289m^{2}, according to documents limit referred to in Article 1, paragraph 3

c) in the Polish village Jaworzynka region with an area of 304 m^{2}, according to documents limit referred to in Article 1, paragraph 4, including real estate, equipment and plants are transferred to the ownership of the Slovak Republic.

Territory of the Slovak Republic with an area of 2,969 m^{2}, including:

a) in the area of a viewing tower on Dukielskie enters an area of 376 m^{2}, according to documents limit referred to in Article 1, paragraph 2

b) Nokiel on the island with an area of 2,289 m^{2}, according to documents limit referred to in Article 1, paragraph 3

c) in the Slovak village Skalité region with an area of 304 m^{2}, according to documents limit referred to in Article 1, paragraph 4, including real estate, equipment and plants are transferred to the ownership of the Republic of Poland.

— Dziennik Ustaw z 2005 r. Nr 203 poz. 1686, .

== See also ==
- Polish–Czechoslovak border conflicts
- Polish historical regions
- Polish question
- Borders of Poland
- Geography of Poland
- Treaty of Warsaw (1970)
