= Outline of Poland =

Country in Central Europe

The Flag of Poland

The Coat of arms of Poland

The location of Poland

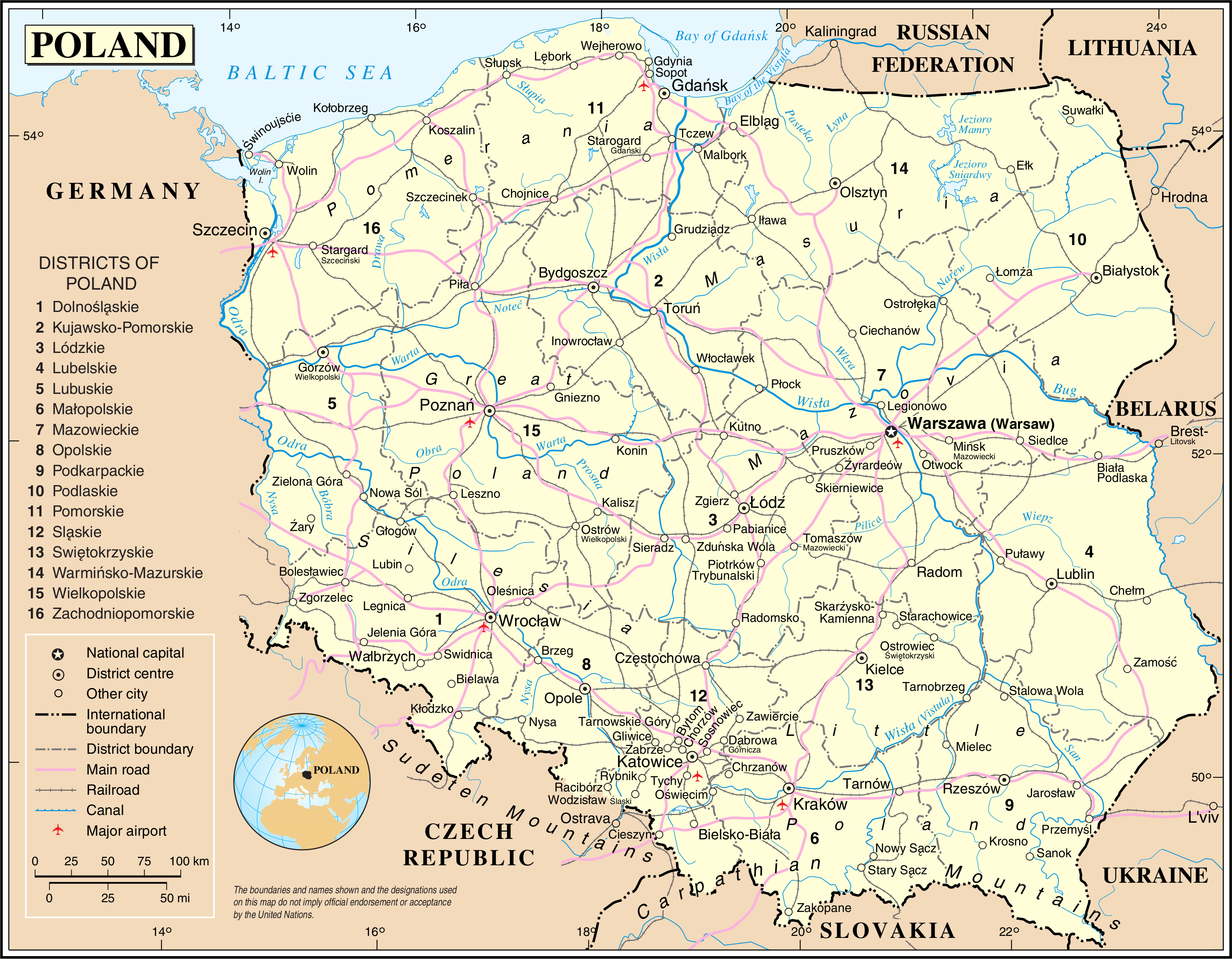
Map of Poland

The following outline is provided as an overview of and topical guide to Poland:

Poland is a sovereign country located in Central Europe. It is bordered by Germany to the west; the Czech Republic and Slovakia to the south; Ukraine, Belarus and Lithuania to the east; and the Baltic Sea and Kaliningrad Oblast, a Russian exclave, to the north. The total area of Poland is 312,679 km^{2} (120,728 sq mi), making it the 69th largest country in the world and 9th in Europe. Poland has a population of over 38.5 million people, which makes it the 33rd most populous country in the world.

The establishment of a Polish state is often identified with the adoption of Christianity by its ruler Mieszko I in 966 (see Baptism of Poland), when the state covered territory similar to that of present-day Poland. Poland became a kingdom in 1025, and in 1569 it cemented a long association with the Grand Duchy of Lithuania by uniting to form the Polish–Lithuanian Commonwealth. The Commonwealth collapsed in 1795, and its territory was partitioned among Prussia, Russia, and Austria. Poland regained its independence in 1918 after World War I but lost it again in World War II, occupied by Nazi Germany and the Soviet Union. Poland lost over six million citizens in World War II, and emerged several years later as a socialist republic within the Eastern Bloc under strong Soviet influence. In 1989 communist rule was overthrown and Poland became what is constitutionally known as the "Third Polish Republic". Poland is a unitary state made up of sixteen voivodeships (Polish: województwo). Poland is also a member of the European Union, NATO and OECD.

== General reference ==
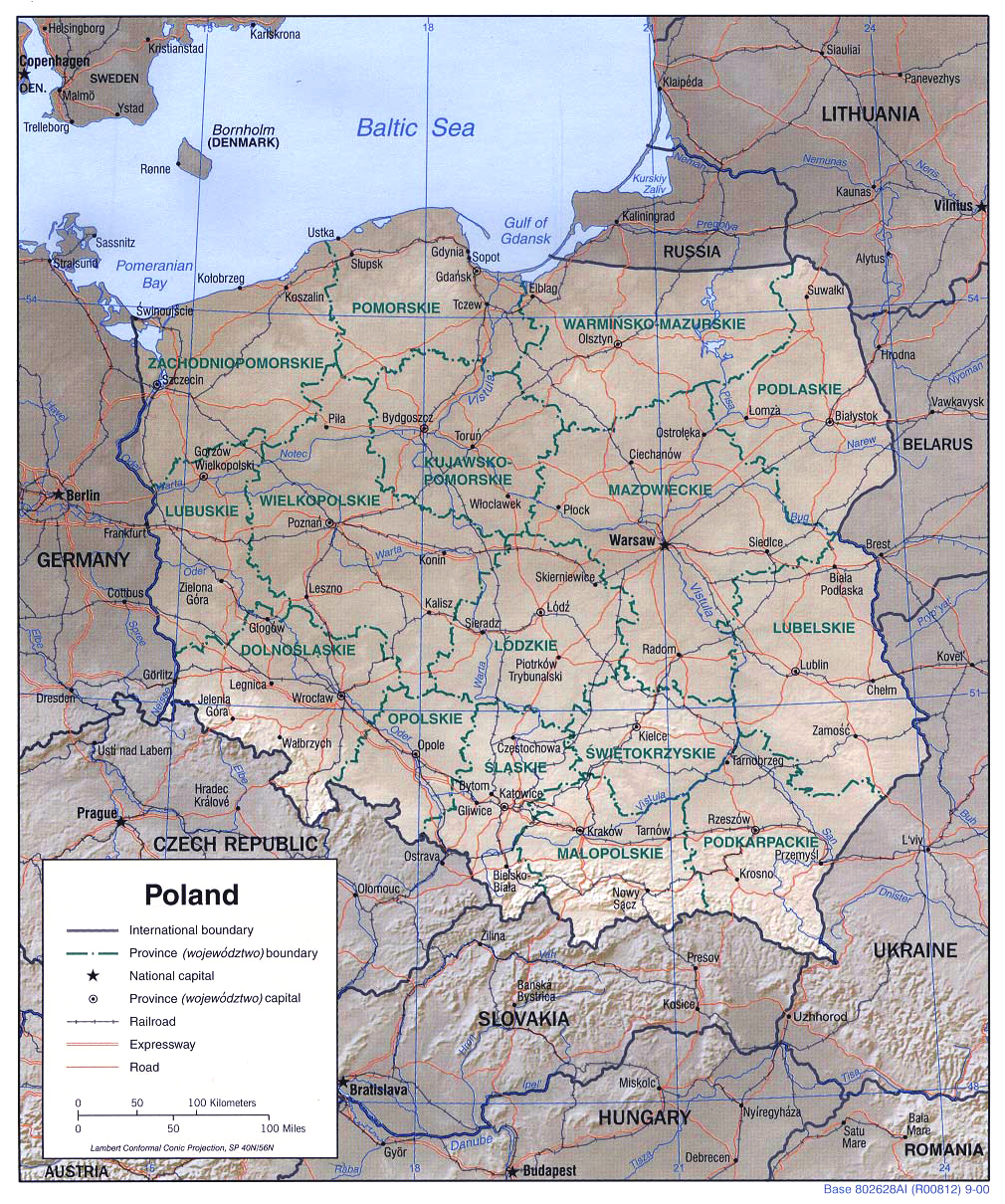
Relief map of Poland

- Pronunciation: /ˈpoʊlənd/
- Common English country name: Poland
- Official English country name: The Republic of Poland
- Common endonym(s): Polska
- Official endonym(s): Rzeczpospolita Polska
- Adjectival(s): Polish, polski(a)–polskie
- Demonym(s): Polish
- Etymology: Name of Poland
- International rankings of Poland
- ISO country codes: PL, POL, 616
- ISO region codes: See ISO 3166-2:PL
- Internet country code top-level domain: .pl

== Geography of Poland ==
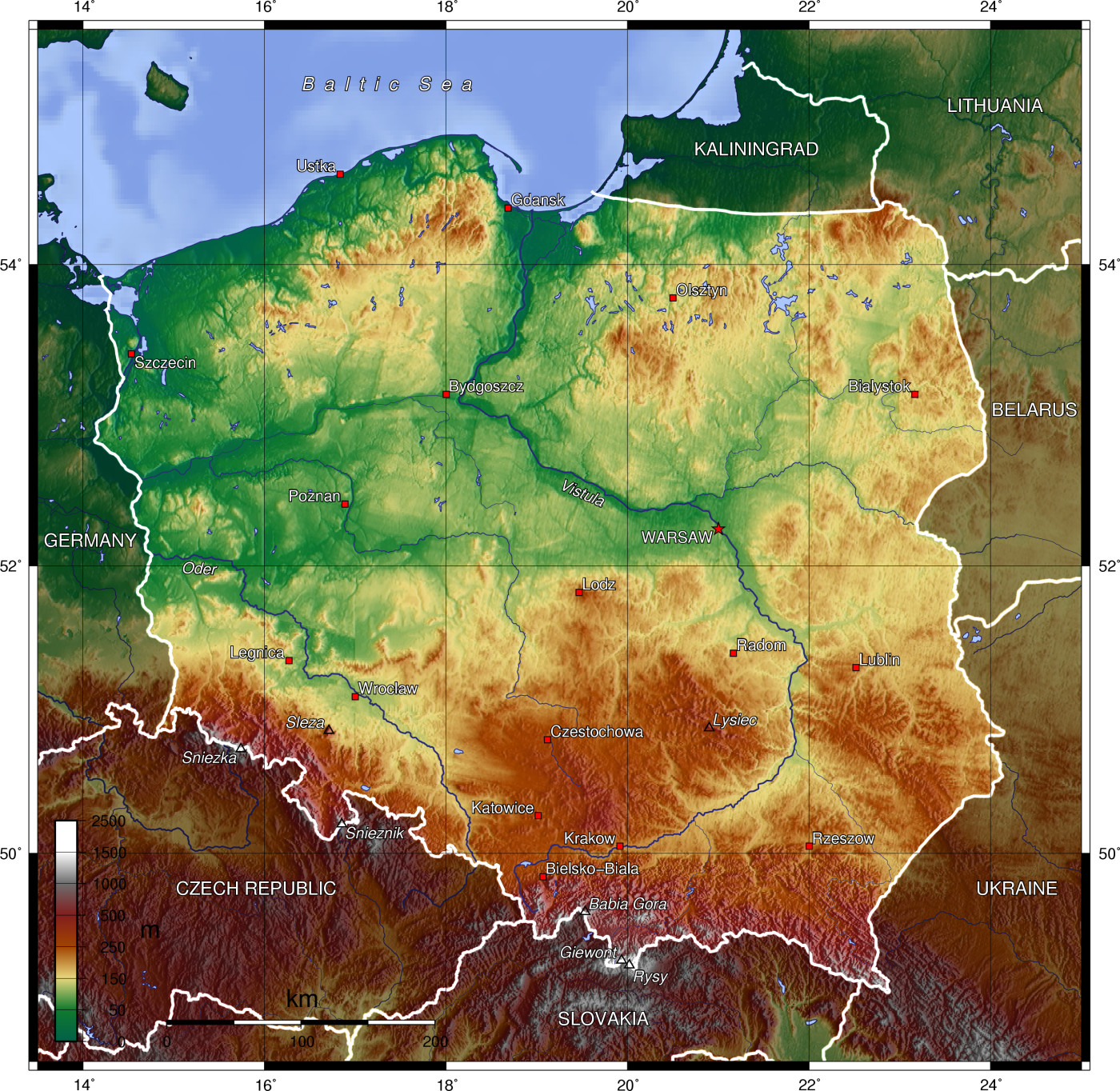
Topographic map of Poland

Geography of Poland

- Poland is: a sovereign state
  - Member state of the European Union
  - Member state of NATO
- Location:
  - Northern Hemisphere and Eastern Hemisphere
  - Eurasia
    - Europe
      - Central Europe
  - Time zone: Central European Time (UTC+01), Central European Summer Time (UTC+02)
  - Extreme points of Poland
    - High: Rysy 2,499 m (8,199 ft)
    - Low: Żuławy Wiślane −1.8 m (−6 ft)
  - Land boundaries: 3,071 km

Czech Republic 796 km
Slovakia 541 km
Ukraine 535 km
Germany 467 km
Belarus 418 km
Russia 210 km
Lithuania 104 km

- Coastline: Baltic Sea 440 km

- Population of Poland: 38,115,967 (June 30, 2007) - 37th most populous country
- Area of Poland: 312679 km^{2}
- Atlas of Poland

=== Environment of Poland ===
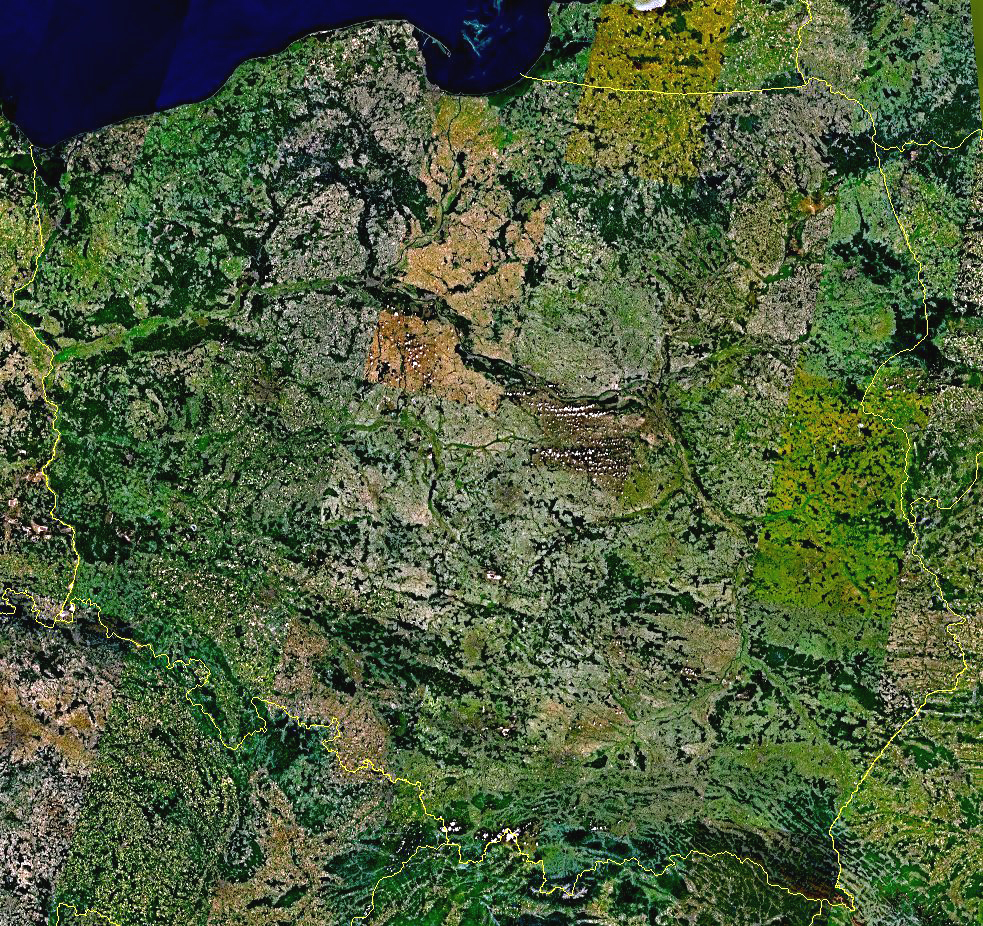
An enlargeable satellite image of Poland

Main: Environment of Poland

- Climate of Poland
- Ecoregions in Poland
- Renewable energy in Poland
- Geology of Poland
- Protected areas of Poland
  - Biosphere reserves in Poland
  - National parks of Poland
- Wildlife of Poland
  - Fauna of Poland
    - Amphibians of Poland
    - Birds of Poland
    - Mammals of Poland

==== Natural geographic features of Poland ====
- Glaciers of Poland
- Islands of Poland
- Lakes of Poland
- Mountains of Poland
  - Volcanoes in Poland
- Rivers of Poland
  - Waterfalls of Poland
- Valleys of Poland
- World Heritage Sites in Poland

=== Regions of Poland ===
Regions of Poland

==== Administrative divisions of Poland ====
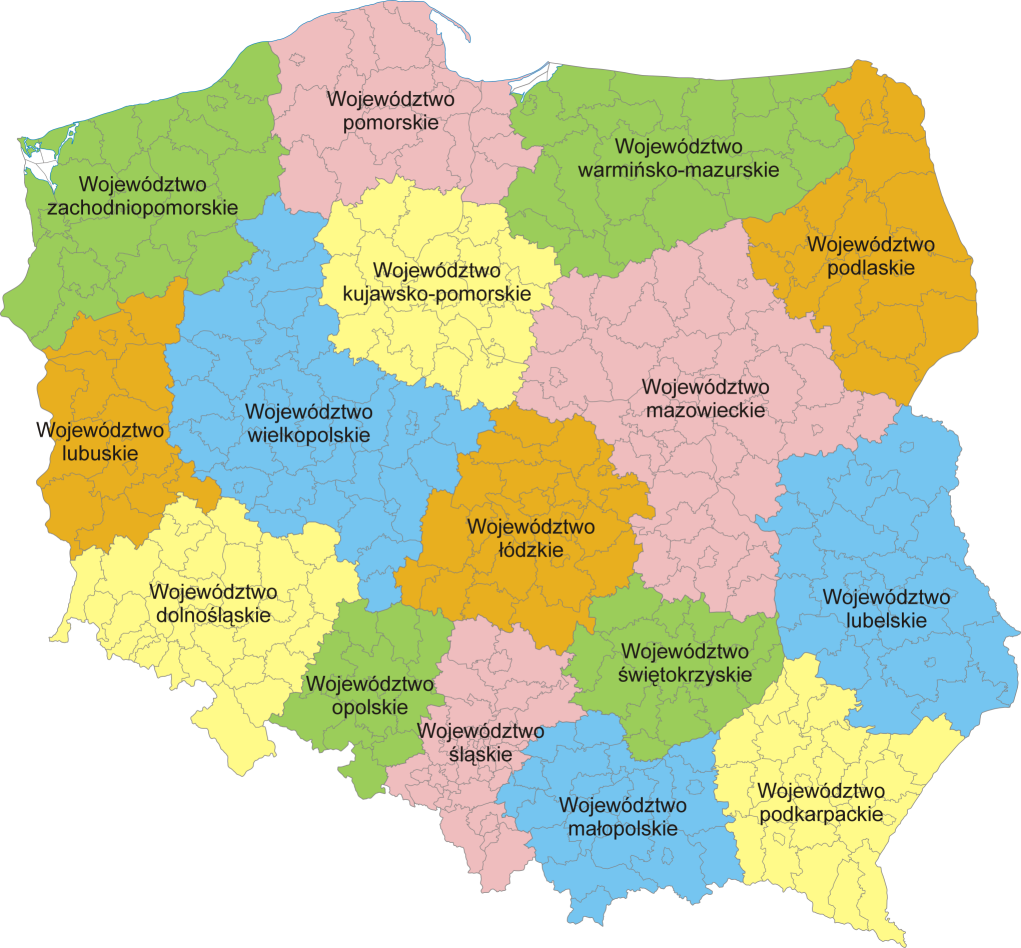
Division of Poland into voivodeships and powiats

Administrative divisions of Poland

- Voivodeships of Poland
  - Powiats of Poland
    - Gminas of Poland

===== Provinces of Poland =====
Provinces of Poland

- Districts of Poland

===== Municipalities of Poland =====
Municipalities of Poland

- Capital of Poland: Warsaw
- Cities of Poland

=== Demography of Poland ===
Demographics of Poland

== Government and politics of Poland ==
- Form of government: unitary parliamentary representative democratic republic
- Capital of Poland: Warsaw
- Elections in Poland
- Political parties in Poland

=== Branches of the government of Poland ===
Government of Poland

==== Executive branch of the government of Poland ====
- Head of state: President of Poland, Karol Nawrocki
- Head of government: Prime Minister of Poland, Donald Tusk
- Cabinet of Poland

==== Legislative branch of the government of Poland ====
- National Assembly of the Republic of Poland (bicameral)
  - Upper house: Senate of Poland
  - Lower house: Sejm of Poland

==== Judicial branch of the government of Poland ====
Court system of Poland

- Supreme Court of Poland

=== Foreign relations of Poland ===
Foreign relations of Poland

- Diplomatic missions in Poland
- Diplomatic missions of Poland

==== International organization membership ====
The Republic of Poland is a member of:

- Arctic Council (observer)
- Australia Group
- Bank for International Settlements (BIS)
- Black Sea Economic Cooperation Zone (BSEC) (observer)
- Central European Initiative (CEI)
- Confederation of European Paper Industries (CEPI)
- Council of Europe (CE)
- Council of the Baltic Sea States (CBSS)
- Euro-Atlantic Partnership Council (EAPC)
- European Bank for Reconstruction and Development (EBRD)
- European Investment Bank (EIB)
- European Organization for Nuclear Research (CERN)
- European Space Agency (ESA) (cooperating state)
- European Union (EU)
- Food and Agriculture Organization (FAO)
- International Atomic Energy Agency (IAEA)
- International Bank for Reconstruction and Development (IBRD)
- International Chamber of Commerce (ICC)
- International Civil Aviation Organization (ICAO)
- International Criminal Court (ICCt)
- International Criminal Police Organization (Interpol)
- International Development Association (IDA)
- International Energy Agency (IEA)
- International Federation of Red Cross and Red Crescent Societies (IFRCS)
- International Finance Corporation (IFC)
- International Hydrographic Organization (IHO)
- International Labour Organization (ILO)
- International Maritime Organization (IMO)
- International Mobile Satellite Organization (IMSO)
- International Monetary Fund (IMF)
- International Olympic Committee (IOC)
- International Organization for Migration (IOM)
- International Organization for Standardization (ISO)
- International Red Cross and Red Crescent Movement (ICRM)
- International Telecommunication Union (ITU)
- International Telecommunications Satellite Organization (ITSO)
- International Trade Union Confederation (ITUC)
- Inter-Parliamentary Union (IPU)
- Multilateral Investment Guarantee Agency (MIGA)
- Nonaligned Movement (NAM) (guest)
- North Atlantic Treaty Organization (NATO)
- Nuclear Suppliers Group (NSG)
- Organisation internationale de la Francophonie (OIF) (observer)
- Organisation for Economic Co-operation and Development (OECD)
- Organization for Security and Cooperation in Europe (OSCE)
- Organisation for the Prohibition of Chemical Weapons (OPCW)
- Organization of American States (OAS) (observer)
- Permanent Court of Arbitration (PCA)
- Schengen Convention
- Southeast European Cooperative Initiative (SECI) (observer)
- United Nations (UN)
- United Nations Conference on Trade and Development (UNCTAD)
- United Nations Disengagement Observer Force (UNDOF)
- United Nations Educational, Scientific, and Cultural Organization (UNESCO)
- United Nations High Commissioner for Refugees (UNHCR)
- United Nations Industrial Development Organization (UNIDO)
- United Nations Interim Force in Lebanon (UNIFIL)
- United Nations Mission for the Referendum in Western Sahara (MINURSO)
- United Nations Mission in Liberia (UNMIL)
- United Nations Mission in the Central African Republic and Chad (MINURCAT)
- United Nations Mission in the Sudan (UNMIS)
- United Nations Observer Mission in Georgia (UNOMIG)
- United Nations Operation in Côte d'Ivoire (UNOCI)
- United Nations Organization Mission in the Democratic Republic of the Congo (MONUC)
- Universal Postal Union (UPU)
- Western European Union (WEU) (associate)
- World Confederation of Labour (WCL)
- World Customs Organization (WCO)
- World Federation of Trade Unions (WFTU)
- World Health Organization (WHO)
- World Intellectual Property Organization (WIPO)
- World Meteorological Organization (WMO)
- World Tourism Organization (UNWTO)
- World Trade Organization (WTO)
- World Veterans Federation
- Zangger Committee (ZC)

=== Law and order in Poland ===
Law of Poland

- Capital punishment in Poland
- Constitution of Poland
- Crime in Poland
- Human rights in Poland
  - LGBT rights in Poland
  - Freedom of religion in Poland
- Law enforcement in Poland

=== Military of Poland ===
Military of Poland

- Command
  - Commander-in-chief:
    - Ministry of Defence of Poland
- Forces
  - Army of Poland
  - Navy of Poland
  - Air Force of Poland
  - Special forces of Poland
- Military history of Poland
- Military ranks of Poland

=== Local government in Poland ===
Local government in Poland

=== Other ===
- Political scandals of Poland

== History of Poland ==
History of Poland

- Timeline of the history of Poland
- Current events of Poland
- Military history of Poland
- History of rail transport in Poland

== Culture of Poland ==
Culture of Poland

- Architecture of Poland
- Cuisine of Poland
- Ethnic minorities in Poland
- Festivals in Poland
- Languages of Poland
- Media in Poland
- National symbols of Poland
  - Coat of arms of Poland
  - Flag of Poland
  - National anthem of Poland
- People of Poland
- Prostitution in Poland
- Public holidays in Poland
- Records of Poland
- Religion in Poland
  - Buddhism in Poland
  - Christianity in Poland
  - Hinduism in Poland
  - Islam in Poland
  - Judaism in Poland
  - Sikhism in Poland
- World Heritage Sites of Poland

=== Art in Poland ===
- Art in Poland
- Cinema of Poland
- Literature of Poland
- Music of Poland
- Television in Poland
- Theatre in Poland

=== Sports in Poland ===
Sports in Poland

- Football in Poland
- Poland at the Olympics

== Economy and infrastructure of Poland ==
Economy of Poland

- Economic rank, by nominal GDP (2018): 22nd (twenty-second)
- Agriculture in Poland
- Banking in Poland
  - National Bank of Poland
- Communications in Poland
  - Internet in Poland
- Companies of Poland
- Currency of Poland: Złoty
  - ISO 4217: PLN
- Energy in Poland
  - Bełchatów Power Station – largest thermal power station in Europe, and one of largest fossil fuel power stations in the world. It produces 27-28 TWh of electricity per year, 20% of Poland's total power generation.
  - Energy policy of Poland
  - Oil industry in Poland
- Health care in Poland
- Mining in Poland
- Poland Stock Exchange
- Tourism in Poland
- Water supply and sanitation in Poland

=== Transportation in Poland ===
Transport in Poland

- Airports in Poland
- Rail transport in Poland
  - High-speed rail in Poland
- Roads in Poland
  - National roads in Poland
    - Motorways in Poland
    - Expressways in Poland
  - Voivodeship roads
  - Powiat roads
  - Gmina roads

== Education in Poland ==
Education in Poland

- List of schools in Poland
- List of universities in Poland

== Health in Poland ==
Health in Poland

== See also ==
Poland

- List of international rankings
- Member state of the European Union
- Member state of the North Atlantic Treaty Organization
- Member state of the United Nations
- Outline of Europe
- Outline of geography
