= Fauna of Poland =

Native animals of Poland

Location of Poland

Fauna of Poland, according to the Polish Museum and Institute of Zoology, includes approximately 36,000 species. The most common type of fauna in Poland are arthropods (Arthropoda), and within the phyla, insects (Insecta) are most numerous.

Polish fauna is represented by vertebrates including but not limited to:

- ray-finned fishes (Actinopterygii) – 129 species (35 species are believed to be non-indigenous)
- amphibians (Amphibia) – 18 species
- reptiles (Reptilia) – 9 species
- birds (Aves) – 435 species
- mammals (Mammalia) – 105 species

== See also ==
- List of birds of Poland
- List of Lepidoptera of Poland
- List of mammals of Poland
- List of non-marine molluscs of Poland
- List of reptiles of Poland
