= List of amphibians of Poland =

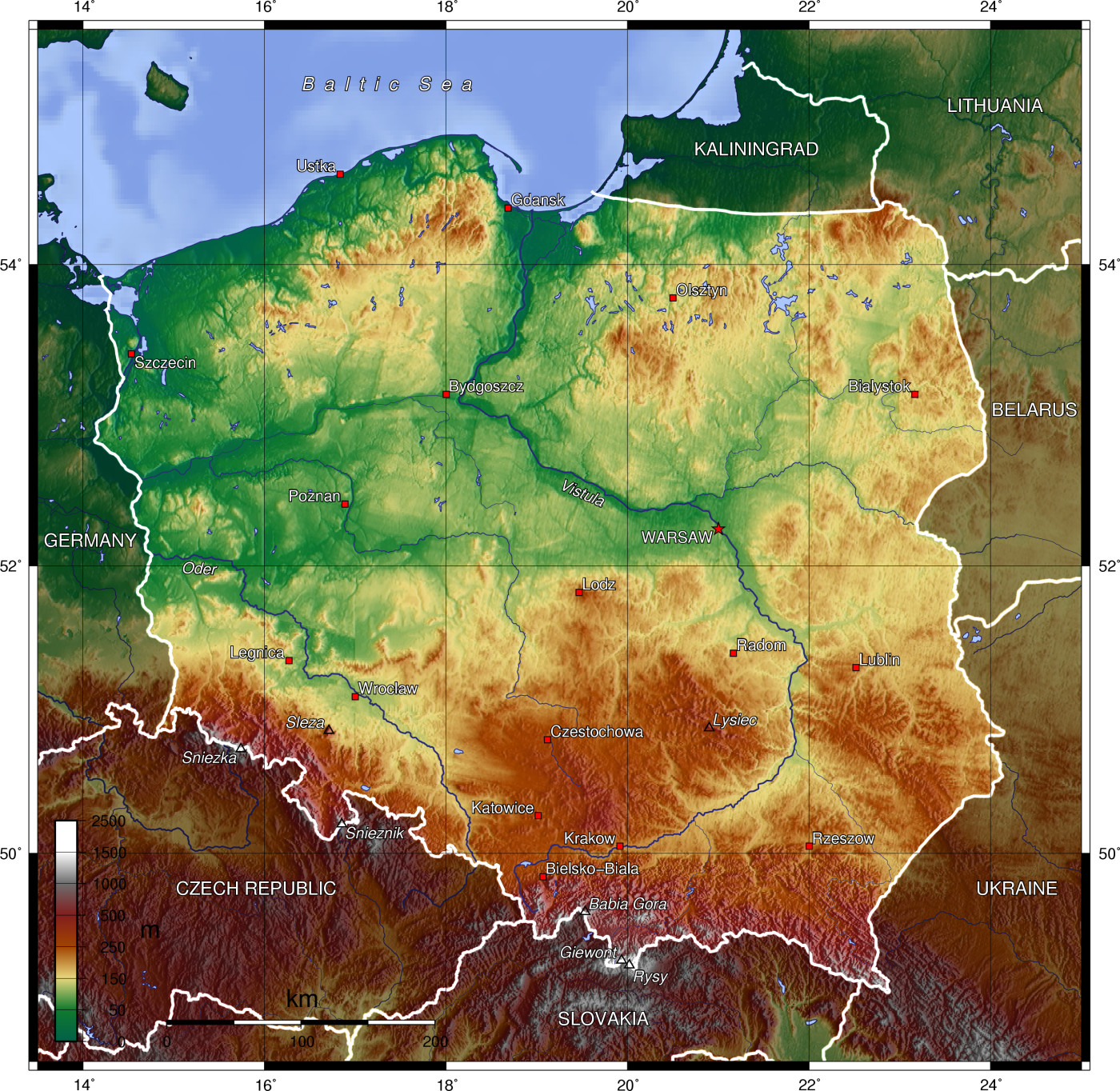
Topographic map of Poland

Poland is inhabited by 18 amphibian species. They include five species of newts and salamanders from a single family, Salamandridae, as well as 13 frog and toad species from five families—Bombinatoridae, Bufonidae, Hylidae, Pelobatidae and Ranidae. All of them are protected by law.

== List of species ==
=== Order Caudata ===
==== Family Salamandridae ====
Salamandridae, or true salamanders, are a family of terrestrial and aquatic salamanders, mostly distributed in Asia and Europe, although some species are found in North Africa and North America. Most species have slightly toxic skin secretions and many develop dorsal body and tail fins when they return to an aquatic stage. There are 109 species in 21 genera; of them, five species in four genera are found in Poland.

Salamandridae
Species	Common name	Distribution	Status	Image
Lissotriton montandoni	Carpathian newt	Occurs in the southern areas of the Subcarpathian, Silesian, and Lesser Poland voivodeships	LC	
Lissotriton vulgaris	smooth newt	Found across the country, most commonly in the lowlands, usually up to 1500 m altitude (1087 m in the Tatra Mountains, and 1250 m in the Karkonosze)	LC	
Ichthyosaura alpestris	Alpine newt	Occurs in the Sudetes, the Carpathians, and the Świętokrzyskie Mountains, up to 1700 m altitude; in the Polish regions of the Tatra Mountains, it can be found at up to 1665 m altitude, in the Small Polish Pond of the Valley of the Five Polish Ponds; it is also fairly common in the Smreczyński Pond and the Gąsienicowa Valley	LC	
Salamandra salamandra	fire salamander	Occurs at altitudes between 250 m and 1087 m in the Carpathian and the Sudety mountains, and up to 1000 m, rarely 1300 m, in the Tatra Mountains	LC	
Triturus cristatus	northern crested newt	Found across the country, usually up to 300 m altitude, except the highest regions of the Tatra and the Sudety mountains	LC	

=== Order Anura ===
==== Family Bombinatoridae ====
Bombinatoridae are an Old World toad family often referred to as fire-bellied toads because of their brightly coloured ventral sides which demonstrate their high toxicity. It includes ten species in two genera, Barbourula and Bombina. Two species from the genus Bombina occur in Poland.

Bombinatoridae
Species	Common name	Distribution	Status	Image
Bombina bombina	European fire-bellied toad	Occurs in the lowlands of the country, but not en masse; up to 400 m attitude	LC	
Bombina variegata	yellow-bellied toad	Occurs primarily in the Carpathian Mountains and on their foothills, as well as in isolated localities in the Kraków-Częstochowa Upland; according to other sources, it can also be found on the eastern foothills of the Sudetes and on the Krakowsko-Chrzanowski ridge	LC	

==== Family Bufonidae ====
Bufonidae are a family of toads native to every continent except Australia and Antarctica. Bufonidae include the typical toads with shortened forelimbs, hindlimbs used for walking or hopping, dry warty skin, and parotoid glands behind eyes. The family contains 590 species in 50 genera, of which 3 species from genus Bufo are found in Poland.

Bufonidae
Species	Common name	Distribution	Status	Image
Bufo bufo	common toad	Found in the whole country	LC	
Bufotes viridis	European green toad	Found in the whole country, except the southernmost regions (according to some sources, it occurs rarely, if at all, in the Tatra Mountains, up to 1000 m attitude; it is commonly found on the southern slopes of the Pieniny mountains)	LC	
Epidalea calamita	natterjack toad	Found in the whole country, except the Carpathian Mountains	LC	

==== Family Hylidae ====
Hylidae or tree frogs are the most diverse amphibian family with 951 species in 51 genera, and worldwide distribution. Most species inhabit tropical areas with warm and humid climate, especially the Neotropics. Hylids range from small to large in size and usually have distinct adhesive toe discs that contain a cartilage offsetting the terminal phalanx, which aids in climbing. The only genus found in Europe is Hyla, with 6 species out of 37 worldwide, and one in Poland.

Hylidae
Species	Common name	Distribution	Status	Image
Hyla arborea	European tree frog	Common in the whole country	LC	

==== Family Pelobatidae ====
Pelobatidae, also known as spadefoot toads, are a small family of frogs with one genus and four species spread in Europe, Western Asia and North-western Africa. They have short legs, stocky bodies with vertical pupils and produce an odour similar to garlic. One of the four species inhabits the country.

Pelobatidae
Species	Common name	Distribution	Status	Image
Pelobates fuscus	common spadefoot	Occurs in the lowlands of the country, but not en masse; absent in the mountains	LC	

==== Family Ranidae ====
Ranidae are a widespread family also known as true frogs. They have generalized frog body plans and a generalized aquatic tadpole stage. The family includes 379 species in 14 genera, of which six species in two genera occur in Poland.

Ranidae
Species	Common name	Distribution	Status	Image
Pelophylax lessonae	pool frog	Found in the whole country, up to 800 m altitude	LC	
Pelophylax ridibundus	marsh frog	Although rare, it can be found in the lowlands of the country	LC	
Rana dalmatina	agile frog	Occurs in southeastern Poland, mainly in the southern regions of the Sandomierz Basin and on the adjacent Carpathian Foothills	LC	
Rana temporaria	common frog	Found in the whole country	LC	
Rana arvalis	moor frog	Common species in the lowlands of the country	LC	

== See also ==
- Geography of Poland
- List of birds of Poland
- List of mammals of Poland
- List of reptiles of Poland

== Footnotes ==
=== Notes ===
a: Conservation status at a world level (not exclusive to Poland) of the species according to the IUCN Red List: Conservation status - IUCN Red List of Threatened Species:

EX - Extinct, EW - Extinct in the wild
CR - Critically endangered, EN - Endangered, VU - Vulnerable
NT - Near threatened, LC - Least concern
DD - Data deficient, NE - Not evaluated
