= Sikhism in Poland =

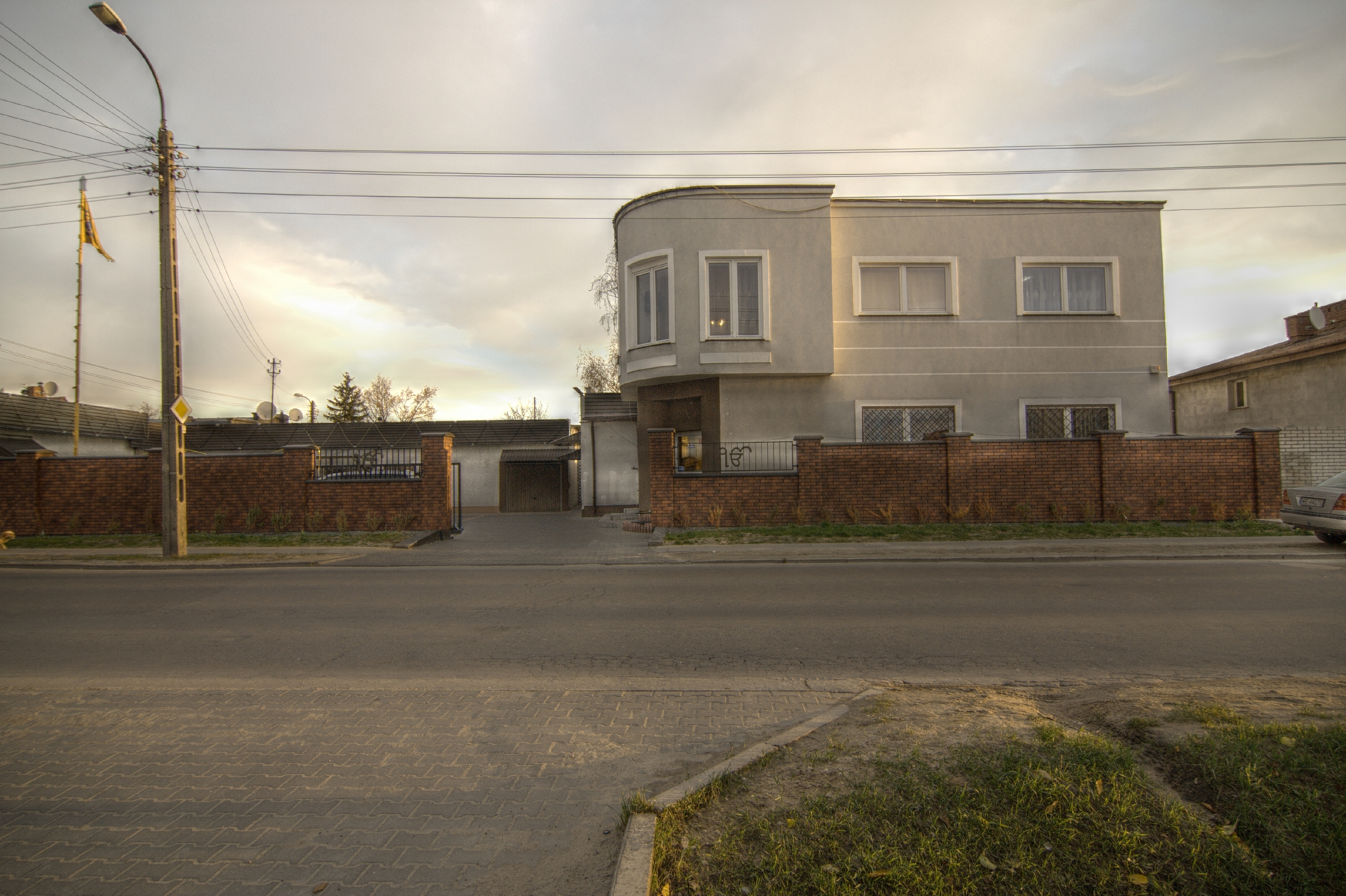
- Singh Saba Gurudwara

Total population
- ~700

Regions with significant populations
- Warsaw

Languages
- Punjabi • Polish

Sikhism in Poland dates back mostly to the 1990s or early 2000s, during the immigration of Indians to Poland. There are about approximately 700 Sikhs in Poland, with the vast majority of them living in the capital of Warsaw.

== Gurdwaras ==
There is only one Gurdwara in Poland. The city's Sikh Gurdwara, called "Gurudwara Sri Guru Singh Sabha", is located in Warsaw, Poland. It is the only Sikh shrine in the whole of Eastern Europe and it is the place where both Sikhs and Sindhis come together to celebrate Baisakhi.

As of 2022, the gurdwara in Warsaw sees about 400 visitors every Sunday. During the 2022 Russian Invasion of Ukraine, Gurdwara Sri Guru Singh Sabha served as a shelter for refugees from Ukraine, some of whom were Indian students studying in Ukrainian universities.

The gurdwara is a two-story orange house in the suburbs, with a courtyard and an addition that serves as a langar hall.

== Controversy ==
Sikhs in Poland are generally treated unfavourably by the locals, especially in more rural areas, due to often being mistaken for Muslims for their usually darker skin, turban and beard.

One incident in 2015 involved a Sikh man, Navjot Sawhney, who was attacked by a bouncer outside a nightclub in Kraków because he looked like a "terrorist".
