= Area of Poland =

The following numbers characterize the area of Poland

- Area of Polish territory - 322,575 square kilometres (124,547 sq mi) (land area, internal waters area and territorial sea area)
- Administrative area of Poland - 312,679 square kilometres (120,726 sq mi). This is calculated according to the official definition of the coastline. Some of Polish administrative units include area of internal waters (8 communes in voivodeship zachodniopomorskie, 2 communes in Pomeranian Voivodeship and 3 communes in Warmian–Masurian Voivodeship). In Poland, there are 2,005 square kilometres (774 sq mi) of internal waters, but only 791 square kilometres (305 sq mi) of it are included in administrative units according to the coast line definition. That is why the administrative area of Poland isn't the same as the area of Poland. By common convention 312,679 square kilometres (120,726 sq mi) is called the (total) area of Poland in encyclopedias and other sources.
- Area of Poland (land area of Poland) - 311,888 square kilometres (120,421 sq mi). Land area includes land waters (lakes, rivers, canals) and this figure is normally used when comparing the area of Poland with the area of other countries.

== See also ==
- Administrative divisions of Poland
- Geography of Poland
- Territorial evolution of Poland
