= List of birds of Poland =

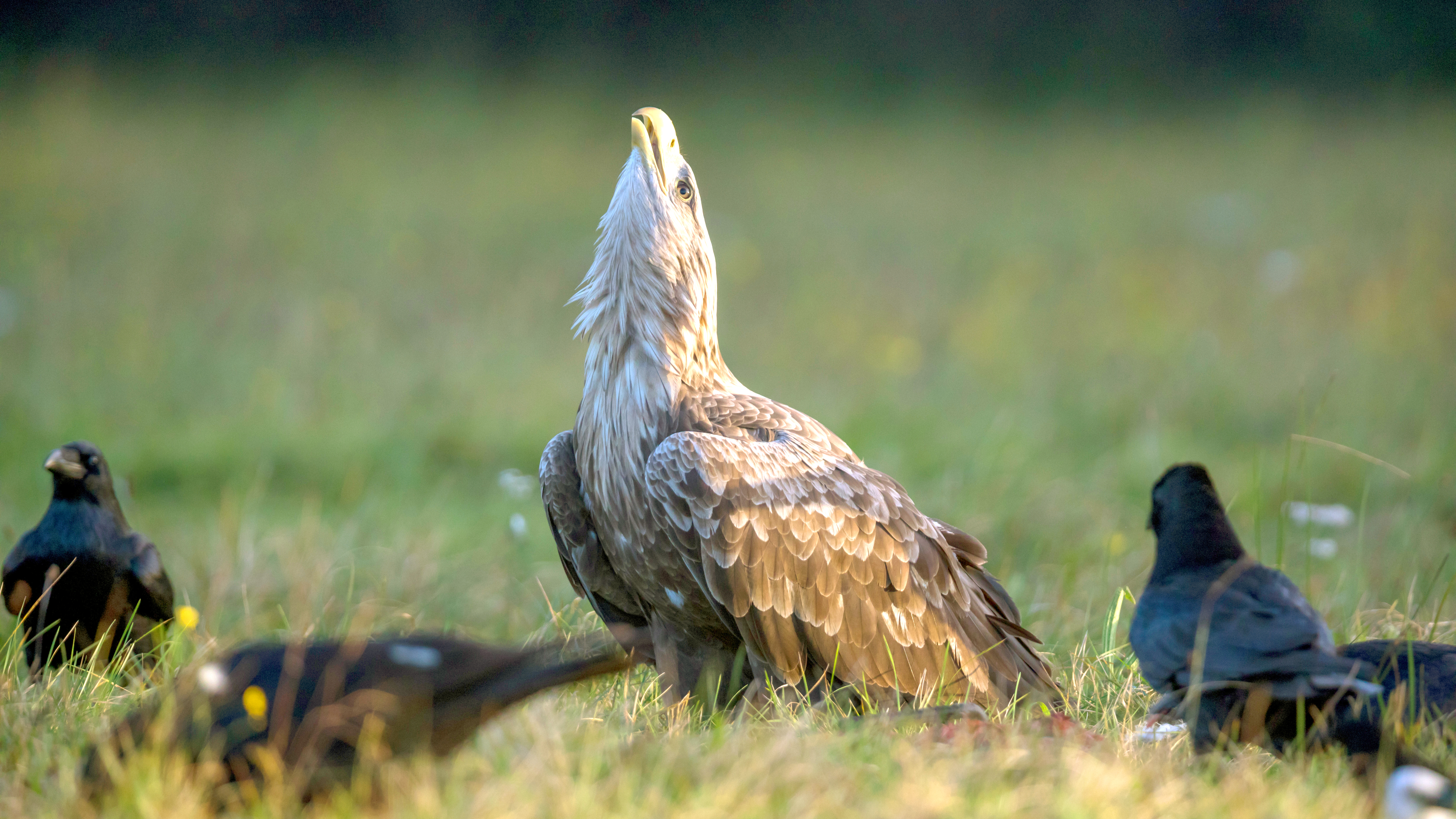
A white-tailed eagle at Gostynin and Włocławek Landscape Park, the national bird of Poland

This is a list of the bird species recorded in Poland. The avifauna of Poland includes 475 species, of which 5 have been introduced by humans and seven have not occurred since 1950.

This list's taxonomic treatment (designation and sequence of orders, families and species) and nomenclature (common and scientific names) follow the conventions of the Polish Fauna Commission (Komisja Faunistyczna), which follows the IOC World Bird List.

The Polish names of the birds, with their scientific names, can be seen in the Polish Wikipedia article.

The following tags have been used to highlight several categories. The commonly occurring native species do not fall into any of these categories.

- (B) Historical - species that have not occurred in Poland since 1950
- (C) Introduced - species introduced to Poland as a consequence, direct or indirect, of human actions
- (*) Rare - species that are rare or accidental in Poland

== Ducks, geese, and waterfowl ==
Order: Anseriformes Family: Anatidae

Anatidae includes the ducks and most duck-like waterfowl, such as geese and swans. These birds are adapted to an aquatic existence with webbed feet, flattened bills, and feathers that are excellent at shedding water due to an oily coating.

Common name	Binomial	Status
White-headed duck	Oxyura leucocephala	*
Mute swan	Cygnus olor	
Tundra swan	Cygnus columbianus	
Whooper swan	Cygnus cygnus	
Brent goose	Branta bernicla	
Red-breasted goose	Branta ruficollis	*
Canada goose	Branta canadensis	C
Barnacle goose	Branta leucopsis	
Greylag goose	Anser anser	
Lesser white-fronted goose	Anser erythropus	*
Greater white-fronted goose	Anser albifrons	
Tundra bean goose	Anser serrirostris	
Pink-footed goose	Anser brachyrhynchus	
Taiga bean goose	Anser fabalis	
Mandarin duck	Aix galericulata	C
Egyptian goose	Alopochen aegyptiaca	C
Common shelduck	Tadorna tadorna	
Ruddy shelduck	Tadorna ferruginea	* C
Long-tailed duck	Clangula hyemalis	
Steller's eider	Polysticta stelleri	*
King eider	Somateria spectabilis	*
Common eider	Somateria mollissima	
Harlequin duck	Histrionicus histrionicus	*
Common scoter	Melanitta nigra	
Black scoter	Melanitta americana	*
Velvet scoter	Melanitta fusca	
Stejneger's scoter	Melanitta stejnegeri	*
Common goldeneye	Bucephala clangula	
Smew	Mergus albellus	
Red-breasted merganser	Mergus serrator	
Goosander	Mergus merganser	
Red-crested pochard	Netta rufina	
Ferruginous duck	Aythya nyroca	
Common pochard	Aythya ferina	
Ring-necked duck	Aythya collaris	*
Tufted duck	Aythya fuligula	
Lesser scaup	Aythya affinis	*
Greater scaup	Aythya marila	
Baikal teal	Sibirionetta formosa	*
Garganey	Spatula querquedula	
Blue-winged teal	Spatula discors	*
Northern shoveler	Spatula clypeata	
Gadwall	Mareca strepera	
Eurasian wigeon	Mareca penelope	
American wigeon	Mareca americana	*
Mallard	Anas platyrhynchos	
Northern pintail	Anas acuta	
Eurasian teal	Anas crecca	
Green-winged teal	Anas (crecca) carolinensis	

== Pheasants, grouse, and allies ==
Order: Galliformes Family: Phasianidae

The Phasianidae are a family of terrestrial birds. In general, they are plump (although they vary in size) and have broad, relatively short wings.

Common name	Binomial	Status
Hazel grouse	Tetrastes bonasia	
Willow ptarmigan	Lagopus lagopus	B
Western capercaillie	Tetrao urogallus	
Black grouse	Lyrurus tetrix	
Common pheasant	Phasianus colchicus	C
Grey partridge	Perdix perdix	
Common quail	Coturnix coturnix	

== Flamingos ==
Order: Phoenicopteriformes Family: Phoenicopteridae

Flamingos are gregarious wading birds, usually 1 to 1.5 metres (3 to 5 ft) tall, found in both the Western and Eastern Hemispheres. Flamingos filter-feed on shellfish and algae. Their oddly shaped beaks are specially adapted to separate mud and silt from the food they consume and, uniquely, are used upside-down.

Common name	Binomial	Status
Greater flamingo	Phoenicopterus roseus	*

== Grebes ==
Order: Podicipediformes Family: Podicipedidae

Grebes are small to medium-large freshwater diving birds. They have lobed toes and are excellent swimmers and divers. However, they have their feet placed far back on the body, making them quite ungainly on land.

Common name	Binomial	Status
Little grebe	Tachybaptus ruficollis	
Pied-billed grebe	Podilymbus podiceps	*
Slavonian grebe	Podiceps auritus	
Red-necked grebe	Podiceps grisegena	
Great crested grebe	Podiceps cristatus	
Black-necked grebe	Podiceps nigricollis	

== Bustards ==
Order: Otidiformes Family: Otididae

Bustards are large terrestrial birds mainly associated with dry open country and steppes in the Old World. They are omnivorous and nest on the ground. They walk steadily on strong legs and big toes, pecking for food as they go. They have long broad wings with "fingered" wingtips and striking patterns in flight. Many have interesting mating displays.

Common name	Binomial	Status
Great bustard	Otis tarda	*
MacQueen's bustard	Chlamydotis macqueenii	*
Little bustard	Tetrax tetrax	*, extinct in Poland

== Cuckoos ==
Order: Cuculiformes Family: Cuculidae

The family Cuculidae includes cuckoos, roadrunners and anis. These birds are of variable size with slender bodies, long tails and strong legs. The Old World cuckoos are brood parasites.

Common name	Binomial	Status
Common cuckoo	Cuculus canorus	

== Sandgrouse ==
Order: Pterocliformes Family: Pteroclidae

Sandgrouse have small, pigeon like heads and necks, but sturdy compact bodies. They have long pointed wings and sometimes tails and a fast direct flight. Flocks fly to watering holes at dawn and dusk. Their legs are feathered down to the toes.

Common name	Binomial	Status
Pallas's sandgrouse	Syrrhaptes paradoxus	*

== Pigeons and doves ==
Order: Columbiformes Family: Columbidae

Pigeons and doves are stout-bodied birds with short necks and short slender bills with a fleshy cere.

Common name	Binomial	Status
Oriental turtle dove	Streptopelia orientalis	*
European turtle dove	Streptopelia turtur	
Eurasian collared dove	Streptopelia decaocto	
Common wood pigeon	Columba palumbus	
Rock dove (Feral pigeon)	Columba livia	C
Stock dove	Columba oenas	

== Cranes ==
Order: Gruiformes Family: Gruidae

Cranes are large, long-legged and long-necked birds. Unlike the similar-looking but unrelated herons, cranes fly with necks outstretched, not pulled back. Most have elaborate and noisy courting displays or "dances".

Common name	Binomial	Status
Sandhill crane	Antigone canadensis	*
Demoiselle crane	Anthropoides virgo	*
Common crane	Grus grus	

== Rails, gallinules and coots ==
Order: Gruiformes Family: Rallidae

Rallidae is a large family of small to medium-sized birds which includes the rails, crakes, coots and gallinules. Typically they inhabit dense vegetation in damp environments near lakes, swamps or rivers. In general they are shy and secretive birds, making them difficult to observe. Most species have strong legs and long toes which are well adapted to soft uneven surfaces. They tend to have short, rounded wings and appear to be weak fliers, though many are capable of long-distance migration.

Common name	Binomial	Status
Water rail	Rallus aquaticus	
Corn crake	Crex crex	
Spotted crake	Porzana porzana	
Common moorhen	Gallinula chloropus	
Eurasian coot	Fulica atra	
Little crake	Zapornia parva	
Baillon's crake	Zapornia pusilla	*

== Stone-curlews ==
Order: Charadriiformes Family: Burhinidae

The stone-curlews or thick-knees are a group of largely tropical waders in the family Burhinidae. They are found worldwide within the tropical zone, with some species also breeding in temperate Europe and Australia. They are medium to large waders with strong black or yellow-black bills, large yellow eyes and cryptic plumage. Despite being classed as waders, most species have a preference for arid or semi-arid habitats.

Common name	Binomial	Status
Eurasian stone-curlew	Burhinus oedicnemus	*

== Stilts and avocets ==
Order: Charadriiformes Family: Recurvirostridae

Recurvirostridae is a family of large wading birds, which includes the avocets and stilts. The avocets have long legs and long up-curved bills. The stilts have extremely long legs and long, thin, straight bills.

Common name	Binomial	Status
Pied avocet	Recurvirostra avosetta	
Black-winged stilt	Himantopus himantopus	

== Oystercatchers ==
Order: Charadriiformes Family: Haematopodidae

The oystercatchers are large and noisy plover-like birds, with strong bills used for smashing or prising open molluscs.

Common name	Binomial	Status
Eurasian oystercatcher	Haematopus ostralegus	

== Plovers and lapwings ==
Order: Charadriiformes Family: Charadriidae

The family Charadriidae includes the plovers, dotterels and lapwings. They are small to medium-sized birds with compact bodies, short, thick necks and long, usually pointed, wings. They are found in open country worldwide, mostly in habitats near water.

Common name	Binomial	Status
Grey plover	Pluvialis squatarola	
European golden plover	Pluvialis apricaria	
American golden plover	Pluvialis dominica	*
Pacific golden plover	Pluvialis fulva	*
Eurasian dotterel	Charadrius morinellus	*
Common ringed plover	Charadrius hiaticula	
Little ringed plover	Charadrius dubius	
Northern lapwing	Vanellus vanellus	
Spur-winged lapwing	Vanellus spinosus	*
Sociable lapwing	Vanellus gregarius	*
White-tailed lapwing	Vanellus leucurus	*
Caspian plover	Anarhynchus asiaticus	*
Tibetan sand plover	Anarhynchus atrifrons	*
Greater sand plover	Anarhynchus leschenaultii	*
Kentish plover	Anarhynchus alexandrinus	*

== Sandpipers and allies ==
Order: Charadriiformes Family: Scolopacidae

Scolopacidae is a large diverse family of small to medium-sized shorebirds including the sandpipers, curlews, godwits, shanks, woodcocks, snipes, dowitchers and phalaropes. The majority of these species eat small invertebrates picked out of the mud or soil. Variation in length of legs and bills enables multiple species to feed in the same habitat, particularly on the coast, without direct competition for food.

Common name	Binomial	Status
Eurasian whimbrel	Numenius phaeopus	
Slender-billed curlew	Numenius tenuirostris	* (extinct)
Eurasian curlew	Numenius arquata	
Bar-tailed godwit	Limosa lapponica	
Black-tailed godwit	Limosa limosa	
Long-billed dowitcher	Limnodromus scolopaceus	*
Jack snipe	Lymnocryptes minimus	
Eurasian woodcock	Scolopax rusticola	
Great snipe	Gallinago media	
Common snipe	Gallinago gallinago	
Terek sandpiper	Xenus cinereus	*
Common sandpiper	Actitis hypoleucos	
Spotted sandpiper	Actitis macularius	*
Red phalarope	Phalaropus fulicarius	*
Red-necked phalarope	Phalaropus lobatus	
Green sandpiper	Tringa ochropus	
Marsh sandpiper	Tringa stagnatilis	
Wood sandpiper	Tringa glareola	
Common redshank	Tringa totanus	
Lesser yellowlegs	Tringa flavipes	*
Spotted redshank	Tringa erythropus	
Common greenshank	Tringa nebularia	
Greater yellowlegs	Tringa melanoleuca	*
Ruddy turnstone	Arenaria interpres	
Red knot	Calidris canutus	
Great knot	Calidris tenuirostris	*
Ruff	Calidris pugnax	
Sharp-tailed sandpiper	Calidris acuminata	*
Broad-billed sandpiper	Calidris falcinellus	
Curlew sandpiper	Calidris ferruginea	
Temminck's stint	Calidris temminckii	
Buff-breasted sandpiper	Calidris subruficollis	*
Sanderling	Calidris alba	
Dunlin	Calidris alpina	
Purple sandpiper	Calidris maritima	*
Baird's sandpiper	Calidris bairdii	*
Pectoral sandpiper	Calidris melanotos	*
Semipalmated sandpiper	Calidris pusilla	*
Little stint	Calidris minuta	
Least sandpiper	Calidris minutilla	*
White-rumped sandpiper	Calidris fuscicollis	*

== Pratincoles and coursers ==
Order: Charadriiformes Family: Glareolidae

Glareolidae is a family of wading birds comprising the pratincoles, which have short legs, long pointed wings and long forked tails, and the coursers, which have long legs, short wings and long, pointed bills which curve downwards.

Common name	Binomial	Status
Black-winged pratincole	Glareola nordmanni	*
Collared pratincole	Glareola pratincola	*

146 Stercorarius parasiticus Parasitic Jaeger A P 147 Stercorarius longicaudus Long-tailed Jaeger A Z 148 Stercorarius pomarinus Pomarine Jaeger A Z 149 Stercorarius skua Great Skua A Z

== Skuas ==
Order: Charadriiformes Family: Stercorariidae

The skuas, some also called jaegers in North America, are medium to large birds, typically with grey or brown plumage, often with white markings on the wings. They nest on the ground in cool temperate and arctic regions and many are long-distance migrants.

Common name	Binomial	Status
Great skua	Stercorarius skua	*
Pomarine skua	Stercorarius pomarinus	*
Arctic skua	Stercorarius parasiticus	
Long-tailed skua	Stercorarius longicaudus	*

== Auks, guillemots, and puffins ==
Order: Charadriiformes Family: Alcidae

Alcids are superficially similar to penguins due to their black-and-white colours, their upright posture and some of their habits, however they are not related to the penguins and differ in being able to fly. Auks live on the open sea, only deliberately coming ashore to nest.

Common name	Binomial	Status
Atlantic puffin	Fratercula arctica	*
Black guillemot	Cepphus grylle	
Razorbill	Alca torda	
Little Auk	Alle alle	*
Brünnich's guillemot	Uria lomvia	*
Common guillemot	Uria aalge	

== Gulls, terns, and skimmers ==
Order: Charadriiformes Family: Laridae

Laridae is a family of medium to large seabirds, including gulls and terns. Gulls are typically grey or white, often with black markings on the head or wings. They have stout, longish bills and webbed feet. Terns are a group of generally medium to large seabirds typically with grey or white plumage, often with black markings on the head. Most terns hunt fish by diving but some pick insects off the surface of fresh water. All are generally long-lived birds, with several species known to live in excess of 30 years.

Common name	Binomial	Status
Little tern	Sternula albifrons	
Caspian tern	Hydroprogne caspia	
Gull-billed tern	Gelochelidon nilotica	*
Whiskered tern	Chlidonias hybrida	*
White-winged tern	Chlidonias leucopterus	
Black tern	Chlidonias niger	
Sandwich tern	Thalasseus sandvicensis	
Arctic tern	Sterna paradisaea	*
Common tern	Sterna hirundo	
Roseate tern	Sterna dougallii	*
Little gull	Hydrocoloeus minutus	
Ross's gull	Rhodostethia rosea	*
Black-legged kittiwake	Rissa tridactyla	
Sabine's gull	Xema sabini	*
Ivory gull	Pagophila eburnea	*
Slender-billed gull	Chroicocephalus genei	*
Black-headed gull	Chroicocephalus ridibundus	
Laughing gull	Leucophaeus atricilla	*
Pallas's gull	Ichthyaetus ichthyaetus	*
Audouin's gull	Ichthyaetus audouinii	*
Mediterranean gull	Ichthyaetus melanocephalus	
Ring-billed gull	Larus delawarensis	*
Common gull	Larus canus	
Caspian gull	Larus cachinnans	
American herring gull	Larus smithsonianus	*
European herring gull	Larus argentatus	
Yellow-legged gull	Larus michahellis	
Great black-backed gull	Larus marinus	
Glaucous gull	Larus hyperboreus	*
Lesser black-backed gull	Larus fuscus	
Slaty-backed gull	Larus schistisagus	*
Iceland gull	Larus glaucoides	*

== Divers ==
Order: Gaviiformes Family: Gaviidae

Divers, known as loons in North America, are a group of aquatic birds found in cooler parts of the Northern Hemisphere. They are the size of a large duck or small goose, which they somewhat resemble when swimming, but to which they are completely unrelated.

Common name	Binomial	Status
Red-throated diver	Gavia stellata	
Great northern diver	Gavia immer	*
White-billed diver	Gavia adamsii	*
Pacific diver	Gavia pacifica	*
Black-throated diver	Gavia arctica	

== Northern storm petrels ==
Order: Procellariiformes Family: Hydrobatidae

The northern storm petrels are relatives of the petrels and are the smallest seabirds. They feed on planktonic crustaceans and small fish picked from the surface, typically while hovering. The flight is fluttering and sometimes bat-like.

Common name	Binomial	Status
European storm petrel	Hydrobates pelagicus	*
Leach's storm petrel	Hydrobates leucorhous	*

== Shearwaters and petrels ==
Order: Procellariiformes Family: Procellariidae

The procellariids are the main group of medium-sized shearwaters and petrels, characterised by united nostrils with medium septum and a long outer functional primary.

Common name	Binomial	Status
Northern fulmar	Fulmarus glacialis	*
Scopoli's shearwater	Calonectris diomedea	*
Sooty shearwater	Ardenna grisea	*
Manx shearwater	Puffinus puffinus	*
Mediterranean shearwater	Puffinus yelkouan	*

== Storks ==
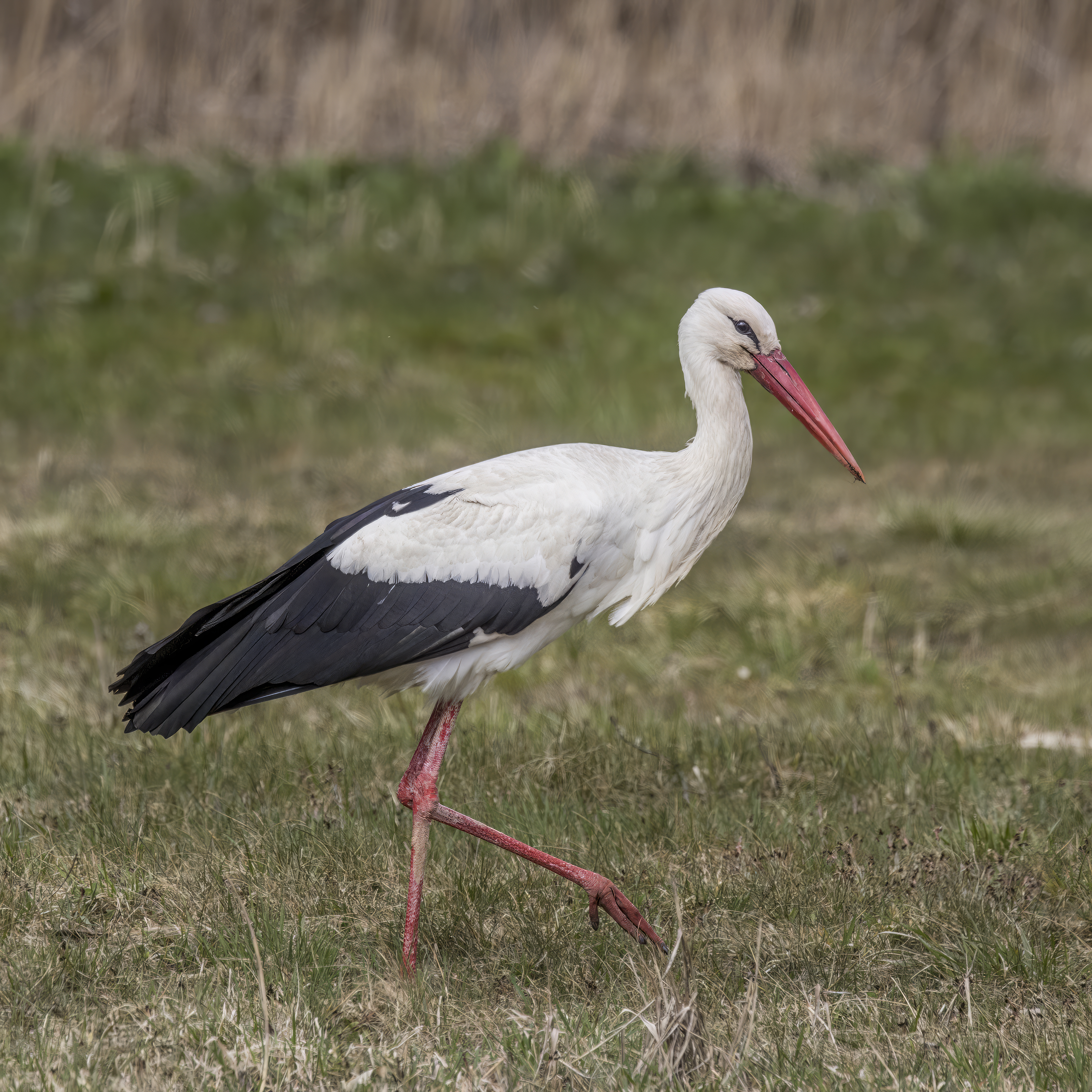
52,000 pairs of white storks breed in Poland

Order: Ciconiiformes Family: Ciconiidae

Storks are large, long-legged, long-necked, wading birds with long, stout bills. Storks are mute, but bill-clattering is an important mode of communication at the nest. Their nests can be large and may be reused for many years. Many species are migratory.

Common name	Binomial	Status
Black stork	Ciconia nigra	
White stork	Ciconia ciconia	

== Boobies and gannets ==
Order: Suliformes Family: Sulidae

The sulids comprise the gannets and boobies. Both groups are medium to large coastal seabirds that plunge-dive for fish.

Common name	Binomial	Status
Northern gannet	Morus bassanus	*
Brown booby	Sula leucogaster	*

== Cormorants and shags ==
Order: Suliformes Family: Phalacrocoracidae

Phalacrocoracidae is a family of medium to large coastal, fish-eating seabirds that includes cormorants and shags. Plumage colouration varies, with the majority having mainly dark plumage, some species being black-and-white and a few being colourful.

Common name	Binomial	Status
Pygmy cormorant	Microcarbo pygmeus	*
European shag	Gulosus aristotelis	*
Great cormorant	Phalacrocorax carbo	

== Ibises and spoonbills ==
Order: Pelecaniformes Family: Threskiornithidae

Threskiornithidae is a family of large terrestrial and wading birds which includes the ibises and spoonbills. They have long, broad wings with 11 primary and about 20 secondary feathers. They are strong fliers and despite their size and weight, very capable soarers.

Common name	Binomial	Status
Glossy ibis	Plegadis falcinellus	*
Eurasian spoonbill	Platalea leucorodia	*

== Pelicans ==
Order: Pelecaniformes Family: Pelecanidae

Pelicans are large water birds with a distinctive pouch under their beak. As with other members of the order Pelecaniformes, they have webbed feet with four toes.

Common name	Binomial	Status
Great white pelican	Pelecanus onocrotalus	*
Dalmatian pelican	Pelecanus crispus	*

== Herons, egrets, and bitterns ==
Order: Pelecaniformes Family: Ardeidae

The family Ardeidae contains the bitterns, herons and egrets. Herons and egrets are medium to large wading birds with long necks and legs. Bitterns tend to be shorter necked and more wary. Members of Ardeidae fly with their necks retracted, unlike other long-necked birds such as storks, ibises and spoonbills.

Common name	Binomial	Status
Great bittern	Botaurus stellaris	
Little bittern	Botaurus minutus	
Little egret	Egretta garzetta	
Black-crowned night heron	Nycticorax nycticorax	
Squacco heron	Ardeola ralloides	*
Great egret	Ardea alba	
Cattle egret	Ardea ibis	*
Purple heron	Ardea purpurea	
Grey heron	Ardea cinerea	

== Nightjars and allies ==
Order: Caprimulgiformes Family: Caprimulgidae

Nightjars are medium-sized nocturnal birds that usually nest on the ground. They have long wings, short legs and very short bills. Most have small feet, of little use for walking, and long pointed wings. Their soft plumage is camouflaged to resemble bark or leaves.

Common name	Binomial	Status
Eurasian nightjar	Caprimulgus europaeus	

== Swifts ==
Order: Caprimulgiformes Family: Apodidae

Swifts are small birds which spend the majority of their lives flying. These birds have very short legs and never settle voluntarily on the ground, perching instead only on vertical surfaces. Many swifts have long swept-back wings which resemble a crescent or boomerang.

Common name	Binomial	Status
Alpine swift	Tachymarptis melba	*
Common swift	Apus apus	
Pallid swift	Apus pallidus	*

== Barn owls ==
Order: Strigiformes Family: Tytonidae

Barn owls are medium to large owls with large heads and characteristic heart-shaped faces. They have long strong legs with powerful talons.

Common name	Binomial	Status
Western barn owl	Tyto alba	

== Owls ==
Order: Strigiformes Family: Strigidae

The typical owls are small to large solitary nocturnal birds of prey. They have large forward-facing eyes and ears, a hawk-like beak and a conspicuous circle of feathers around each eye called a facial disk.

Common name	Binomial	Status
Tengmalm's owl	Aegolius funereus	
Little owl	Athene noctua	
Northern hawk owl	Surnia ulula	*
Eurasian pygmy owl	Glaucidium passerinum	
Eurasian scops owl	Otus scops	*
Short-eared owl	Asio flammeus	
Long-eared owl	Asio otus	
Snowy owl	Bubo scandiacus	*
Eurasian eagle-owl	Bubo bubo	
Tawny owl	Strix aluco	
Ural owl	Strix uralensis	
Great grey owl	Strix nebulosa	*

== Osprey ==
Order: Accipitriformes Family: Pandionidae

The family Pandionidae contains only one species, the osprey. The osprey is a medium-large raptor which is a specialist fish-eater with a worldwide distribution.

Common name	Binomial	Status
Osprey	Pandion haliaetus	

== Hawks, eagles, and kites ==
Order: Accipitriformes Family: Accipitridae

Accipitridae is a family of birds of prey, which includes hawks, eagles, kites, harriers and Old World vultures. These birds have powerful hooked beaks for tearing flesh from their prey, strong legs, powerful talons and keen eyesight.

Common name	Binomial	Status
Black-winged kite	Elanus caeruleus	*
Bearded vulture	Gypaetus barbatus	*
Egyptian vulture	Neophron percnopterus	*
European honey buzzard	Pernis apivorus	
Eurasian black vulture	Aegypius monachus	*
Griffon vulture	Gyps fulvus	*
Short-toed snake eagle	Circaetus gallicus	
Greater spotted eagle	Clanga clanga	
Lesser spotted eagle	Clanga pomarina	
Booted eagle	Hieraaetus pennatus	*
Steppe eagle	Aquila nipalensis	*
Eastern imperial eagle	Aquila heliaca	*
Golden eagle	Aquila chrysaetos	
Bonelli's eagle	Aquila fasciata	*
Levant sparrowhawk	Tachyspiza brevipes	*
Eurasian sparrowhawk	Accipiter nisus	
Eurasian goshawk	Astur gentilis	
Pallid harrier	Circus macrourus	*
Hen harrier	Circus cyaneus	
Montagu's harrier	Circus pygargus	
Western marsh harrier	Circus aeruginosus	
Red kite	Milvus milvus	
Black kite	Milvus migrans	
Pallas's fish eagle	Haliaeetus leucoryphus	B *
White-tailed eagle	Haliaeetus albicilla	
Rough-legged buzzard	Buteo lagopus	
Common buzzard	Buteo buteo	
Long-legged buzzard	Buteo rufinus	

== Hoopoes ==
Order: Bucerotiformes Family: Upupidae

Hoopoes have black, white and orangey-pink colouring with a large erectile crest on their head.

Common name	Binomial	Status
Common hoopoe	Upupa epops	

== Rollers ==
Order: Coraciiformes Family: Coraciidae

Rollers resemble crows in size and build, but are more closely related to the kingfishers and bee-eaters. They share the colourful appearance of those groups with blues and browns predominating. The two inner front toes are connected, but the outer toe is not.

Common name	Binomial	Status
European roller	Coracias garrulus	

== Bee-eaters ==
Order: Coraciiformes Family: Meropidae

The bee-eaters are a group of coraciiform birds in the family Meropidae. Most species are found in Africa but others occur in southern Europe, Madagascar, Australia and New Guinea. They are characterised by richly coloured plumage, slender bodies and usually elongated central tail feathers. All are colourful and have long downturned bills and pointed wings, which give them a swallow-like appearance when seen from afar.

Common name	Binomial	Status
European bee-eater	Merops apiaster	

== Kingfishers ==
Order: Coraciiformes Family: Alcedinidae

Kingfishers are medium-sized birds with large heads, long, pointed bills, short legs and stubby tails.

Common name	Binomial	Status
Common kingfisher	Alcedo atthis	
Pied kingfisher	Ceryle rudis	B *

== Woodpeckers ==
Order: Piciformes Family: Picidae

Woodpeckers are small to medium-sized birds with chisel-like beaks, short legs, stiff tails and long tongues used for capturing insects. Some species have feet with two toes pointing forward and two backward, while several species have only three toes. Many woodpeckers have the habit of tapping noisily on tree trunks with their beaks.

Common name	Binomial	Status
Eurasian wryneck	Jynx torquilla	
Grey-headed woodpecker	Picus canus	
Eurasian green woodpecker	Picus viridis	
Black woodpecker	Dryocopus martius	
Eurasian three-toed woodpecker	Picoides tridactylus	
Middle spotted woodpecker	Dendrocoptes medius	
White-backed woodpecker	Dendrocopos leucotos	
Great spotted woodpecker	Dendrocopos major	
Syrian woodpecker	Dendrocopos syriacus	
Lesser spotted woodpecker	Dryobates minor	

== Falcons and caracaras ==
Order: Falconiformes Family: Falconidae

Falconidae is a family of diurnal birds of prey. They differ from hawks, eagles and kites in that their beaks have a tomial tooth.

Common name	Binomial	Status
Lesser kestrel	Falco naumanni	*
Eurasian kestrel	Falco tinnunculus	
Red-footed falcon	Falco vespertinus	
Merlin	Falco columbarius	
Eleonora's falcon	Falco eleonorae	*
Eurasian hobby	Falco subbuteo	
Peregrine falcon	Falco peregrinus	
Lanner falcon	Falco biarmicus	*
Gyrfalcon	Falco rusticolus	*
Saker falcon	Falco cherrug	*

== Vireos, shrike-babblers, and erpornis ==
Order: Passeriformes Family: Vireonidae

The vireos are a group of small to medium-sized passerine birds restricted to the New World and Southeast Asia.

Common name	Binomial	Status
Red-eyed vireo	Vireo olivaceus	*

== Old World orioles ==
Order: Passeriformes Family: Oriolidae

The Old World orioles are colourful passerine birds. They are not related to the New World orioles.

Common name	Binomial	Status
Eurasian golden oriole	Oriolus oriolus	

== Shrikes ==
Order: Passeriformes Family: Laniidae

Common name	Binomial	Status
Great grey shrike	Lanius excubitor	
Northern shrike	Lanius borealis	*
Lesser grey shrike	Lanius minor	
Woodchat shrike	Lanius senator	
Isabelline shrike	Lanius isabellinus	*
Red-backed shrike	Lanius collurio	
Red-tailed shrike	Lanius phoenicuroides	*

== Crows, jays, and magpies ==
Order: Passeriformes Family: Corvidae

The family Corvidae includes crows, ravens, jays, choughs, magpies, treepies, nutcrackers and ground jays. Corvids are above average in size among the Passeriformes, and some of the larger species show high levels of intelligence.

Common name	Binomial	Status
Yellow-billed chough	Pyrrhocorax graculus	*
Siberian jay	Perisoreus infaustus	*
Eurasian jay	Garrulus glandarius	
Eurasian magpie	Pica pica	
Eurasian nutcracker	Nucifraga caryocatactes	
Eurasian jackdaw	Corvus monedula	
Rook	Corvus frugilegus	
Common raven	Corvus corax	
Carrion crow	Corvus corone	
Hooded crow	Corvus (corone) cornix	

== Penduline tits ==
Order: Passeriformes Family: Remizidae

The penduline tits are a group of small passerine birds related to the true tits. They are insectivores.

Common name	Binomial	Status
Eurasian penduline tit	Remiz pendulinus	

== Tits, chickadees, and titmice ==
Order: Passeriformes Family: Paridae

The Paridae are mainly small stocky woodland species with short stout bills. Some have crests. They are adaptable birds, with a mixed diet including seeds and insects.

Common name	Binomial	Status
Eurasian blue tit	Parus caeruleus	
Azure tit	Parus cyanus	*
Great tit	Parus major	
Coal tit	Parus ater	
Crested tit	Parus cristatus	
Marsh tit	Parus palustris	
Willow tit	Parus montanus	

== Bearded reedling ==
Order: Passeriformes Family: Panuridae

This species, the only one in its family, is found in reed beds throughout temperate Europe and Asia.

Common name	Binomial	Status
Bearded reedling	Panurus biarmicus	

== Larks ==
Order: Passeriformes Family: Alaudidae

Larks are small terrestrial birds with often extravagant songs and display flights. Most larks are fairly dull in appearance. Their food is insects and seeds.

Common name	Binomial	Status
Wood lark	Lullula arborea	
White-winged lark	Alauda leucoptera	*
Eurasian skylark	Alauda arvensis	
Crested lark	Galerida cristata	
Shore lark	Eremophila alpestris	
Greater short-toed lark	Calandrella brachydactyla	*
Bimaculated lark	Melanocorypha bimaculata	*
Black lark	Melanocorypha yeltoniensis	*
Calandra lark	Melanocorypha calandra	*

== Reed warblers and allies ==
Order: Passeriformes Family: Acrocephalidae

The members of this family are mostly olivaceous brown above with much yellow to beige below, but some are yellow-green; many are plain, others are streaked. They are usually found in open woodland, reedbeds, or tall grass. The family occurs mostly in southern to western Eurasia and surroundings, but it also ranges far into the Pacific, with some species in Africa.

Common name	Binomial	Status
Icterine warbler	Hippolais icterina	
Melodious warbler	Hippolais polyglotta	
Booted warbler	Iduna caligata	*
Sykes's warbler	Iduna rama	*
Eastern olivaceous warbler	Iduna pallida	*
Sedge warbler	Acrocephalus schoenobaenus	
Aquatic warbler	Acrocephalus paludicola	
Moustached warbler	Acrocephalus melanopogon	*
Paddyfield warbler	Acrocephalus agricola	*
Blyth's reed warbler	Acrocephalus dumetorum	
Marsh warbler	Acrocephalus palustris	
Eurasian reed warbler	Acrocephalus scirpaceus	
Great reed warbler	Acrocephalus arundinaceus	

== Grassbirds and allies ==
Order: Passeriformes Family: Locustellidae

Locustellidae are a family of small insectivorous songbirds found mainly in Eurasia, Africa, and the Australian region. They are smallish birds with tails that are usually long and pointed, and tend to be drab brownish or buffy all over.

Common name	Binomial	Status
Pallas's grasshopper warbler	Helopsaltes certhiola	*
River warbler	Locustella fluviatilis	
Savi's warbler	Locustella luscinioides	
Common grasshopper warbler	Locustella naevia	

== Swallows ==
Order: Passeriformes Family: Hirundinidae

The family Hirundinidae is adapted to aerial feeding. They have a slender streamlined body, long pointed wings and a short bill with a wide gape. The feet are adapted to perching rather than walking, and the front toes are partially joined at the base.

Common name	Binomial	Status
Sand martin	Riparia riparia	
Barn swallow	Hirundo rustica	
Western house martin	Delichon urbicum	
Red-rumped swallow	Cecropis rufula	*

== Long-tailed tits ==
Order: Passeriformes Family: Aegithalidae

Long-tailed tits are a group of small passerine birds with medium to long tails. They make woven bag nests in trees. Most eat a mixed diet which includes insects.

Common name	Binomial	Status
Long-tailed tit	Aegithalos caudatus	

== Bush warblers and allies ==
Order: Passeriformes Family: Cettiidae

The members of this family are found across warmer areas of Europe, Africa, Asia, and Polynesia. They are insectivores.

Common name	Binomial	Status
Cetti's warbler	Cettia cetti	*

== Leaf warblers ==
Order: Passeriformes Family: Phylloscopidae

Leaf warblers are a family of small insectivorous birds found mostly in Eurasia and ranging into Wallacea and Africa. The species are of various sizes, often green-plumaged above and yellow below, or more subdued with greyish-green to greyish-brown colours.

Common name	Binomial	Status
Wood warbler	Phylloscopus sibilatrix	
Western Bonelli's warbler	Phylloscopus bonelli	*
Yellow-browed warbler	Phylloscopus inornatus	
Hume's leaf warbler	Phylloscopus humei	*
Pallas's leaf warbler	Phylloscopus proregulus	*
Radde's warbler	Phylloscopus schwarzi	*
Dusky warbler	Phylloscopus fuscatus	*
Willow warbler	Phylloscopus trochilus	
Iberian chiffchaff	Phylloscopus ibericus	*
Common chiffchaff	Phylloscopus collybita	
Greenish warbler	Phylloscopus trochiloides	
Arctic warbler	Phylloscopus borealis	*

== Sylviid warblers and allies ==
Order: Passeriformes Family: Sylviidae

The family Sylviidae is a group of small insectivorous passerine birds. They mainly occur as breeding species, as the common name implies, in Europe, Asia and, to a lesser extent, Africa. Most are of generally undistinguished appearance, but many have distinctive songs.

Common name	Binomial	Status
Garden warbler	Sylvia borin	
Eurasian blackcap	Sylvia atricapilla	
Barred warbler	Curruca nisoria	
Lesser whitethroat	Curruca curruca	
Menetries's warbler	Curruca mystacea	*
Common whitethroat	Curruca communis	
Sardinian warbler	Curruca melanocephala	*
Western subalpine warbler	Curruca iberiae	*
Eastern subalpine warbler	Curruca cantillans	*

== Waxwings ==
Order: Passeriformes Family: Bombycillidae

The waxwings are a group of birds with soft silky plumage and unique red tips to some of the wing feathers. In the Bohemian and cedar waxwings, these tips look like sealing wax and give the group its name. These are arboreal birds of northern forests. They live on insects in summer and berries in winter.

Common name	Binomial	Status
Bohemian waxwing	Bombycilla garrulus	

== Crests ==
Order: Passeriformes Family: Regulidae

The crests, also called kinglets, are a small group of birds formerly included in the Old World warblers, but now given family status because they are genetically distant.

Common name	Binomial	Status
Goldcrest	Regulus regulus	
Common firecrest	Regulus ignicapilla	

== Wallcreeper ==
Order: Passeriformes Family: Tichodromidae

The wallcreeper is a small bird related to the nuthatch family, which has stunning crimson, grey and black plumage.

Common name	Binomial	Status
Wallcreeper	Tichodroma muraria	

== Nuthatches ==
Order: Passeriformes Family: Sittidae

Nuthatches are small woodland birds. They have the unusual ability to climb down trees head first, unlike other birds which can only go upwards. Nuthatches have big heads, short tails and powerful bills and feet.

Common name	Binomial	Status
Eurasian nuthatch	Sitta europaea	

== Treecreepers ==
Order: Passeriformes Family: Certhiidae

Treecreepers are small woodland birds, brown above and white below. They have thin pointed down-curved bills, which they use to extricate insects from bark. They have stiff tail feathers, like woodpeckers, which they use to support themselves on vertical trees.

Common name	Binomial	Status
Eurasian treecreeper	Certhia familiaris	
Short-toed treecreeper	Certhia brachydactyla	

== Wrens ==
Order: Passeriformes Family: Troglodytidae

The wrens are mainly small and inconspicuous except for their loud songs. These birds have short wings and thin down-turned bills. Several species often hold their tails upright. All are insectivorous.

Common name	Binomial	Status
Eurasian wren	Troglodytes troglodytes	

== Starlings ==
Order: Passeriformes Family: Sturnidae

Starlings are small to medium-sized passerine birds. Their flight is strong and direct and they are very gregarious. Their preferred habitat is fairly open country. They eat insects and fruit. Plumage is typically dark with a metallic sheen.

Common name	Binomial	Status
Spotless starling	Sturnus unicolor	*
Common starling	Sturnus vulgaris	
Rosy starling	Pastor roseus	*

== Dippers ==
Order: Passeriformes Family: Cinclidae

Dippers are a group of perching birds whose habitat includes aquatic environments in the Americas, Europe and Asia. They are named for their bobbing or dipping movements.

Common name	Binomial	Status
White-throated dipper	Cinclus cinclus	

== Thrushes and allies ==
Order: Passeriformes Family: Turdidae

The thrushes are a group of passerine birds that occur mainly in the Old World. They are plump, soft plumaged, small to medium-sized insectivores or sometimes omnivores, often feeding on the ground. Many have attractive songs.

Common name	Binomial	Status
White's thrush	Zoothera aurea	*
Siberian thrush	Geokichla sibirica	*
Mistle thrush	Turdus viscivorus	
Song thrush	Turdus philomelos	
Redwing	Turdus iliacus	
Common blackbird	Turdus merula	
Fieldfare	Turdus pilaris	
Ring ouzel	Turdus torquatus	
Naumann's thrush	Turdus naumanni	*
Dusky thrush	Turdus eunomus	*
Red-throated thrush	Turdus ruficollis	*
Black-throated thrush	Turdus atrogularis	*
Eyebrowed thrush	Turdus obscurus	*

== Old World flycatchers ==
Order: Passeriformes Family: Muscicapidae

Old World flycatchers are a large group of small passerine birds native to the Old World. They are mainly small arboreal insectivores. The appearance of these birds is highly varied, but they mostly have weak songs and harsh calls.

Common name	Binomial	Status
Spotted flycatcher	Muscicapa striata	
European robin	Erithacus rubecula	
Common nightingale	Luscinia megarhynchos	
Thrush nightingale	Luscinia luscinia	
Bluethroat	Luscinia svecica	
Rufous-tailed robin	Larvivora sibilans	*
Red-breasted flycatcher	Ficedula parva	
Collared flycatcher	Ficedula albicollis	
European pied flycatcher	Ficedula hypoleuca	
Red-flanked bluetail	Tarsiger cyanurus	*
Black redstart	Phoenicurus ochruros	
Common redstart	Phoenicurus phoenicurus	
Common rock thrush	Monticola saxatilis	*
Whinchat	Saxicola rubetra	
Siberian stonechat	Saxicola maurus	*
European stonechat	Saxicola rubicola	
Desert wheatear	Oenanthe deserti	*
Western black-eared wheatear	Oenanthe hispanica	*
Pied wheatear	Oenanthe pleschanka	*
Northern wheatear	Oenanthe oenanthe	
Isabelline wheatear	Oenanthe isabellina	*
White-crowned wheatear	Oenanthe leucopyga	*

== Accentors ==
Order: Passeriformes Family: Prunellidae

The accentors or dunnocks are in the only bird family, Prunellidae, which is completely endemic to the Palearctic. They are small, fairly drab species superficially similar to sparrows but with a slender bill.

Common name	Binomial	Status
Alpine accentor	Prunella collaris	
Black-throated accentor	Prunella atrogularis	*
Dunnock	Prunella modularis	
Siberian accentor	Prunella montanella	*

== Old World sparrows ==
Order: Passeriformes Family: Passeridae

Old World sparrows are small passerine birds. In general, sparrows tend to be small, plump, brown or grey birds with short tails and short powerful beaks. Sparrows are seed eaters, but they also consume small insects.

Common name	Binomial	Status
Rock sparrow	Petronia petronia	B *
White-winged snowfinch	Montifringilla nivalis	B *
Tree sparrow	Passer montanus	
House sparrow	Passer domesticus	

== Wagtails and pipits ==
Order: Passeriformes Family: Motacillidae

Motacillidae is a family of small passerine birds with medium to long tails. They include the wagtails and pipits. They are slender, ground feeding insectivores of open country.

Common name	Binomial	Status
Grey wagtail	Motacilla cinerea	
Western yellow wagtail	Motacilla flava	
Citrine wagtail	Motacilla citreola	
Eastern yellow wagtail	Motacilla tschutschensis	*
White wagtail	Motacilla alba	
Blyth's pipit	Anthus godlewskii	*
Tawny pipit	Anthus campestris	
Richard's pipit	Anthus richardi	*
Tree pipit	Anthus trivialis	
Olive-backed pipit	Anthus hodgsoni	*
Red-throated pipit	Anthus cervinus	
Meadow pipit	Anthus pratensis	
Rock pipit	Anthus petrosus	
Water pipit	Anthus spinoletta	

== Finches and allies ==
Order: Passeriformes Family: Fringillidae

Finches are seed-eating passerine birds, that are small to moderately large and have a strong beak, usually conical and in some species very large. All have twelve tail feathers and nine primaries. These birds have a bouncing flight with alternating bouts of flapping and gliding on closed wings, and most sing well.

Common name	Binomial	Status
Brambling	Fringilla montifringilla	
Eurasian chaffinch	Fringilla coelebs	
Hawfinch	Coccothraustes coccothraustes	
Common rosefinch	Carpodacus erythrinus	
Pine grosbeak	Pinicola enucleator	*
Eurasian bullfinch	Pyrrhula pyrrhula	
Trumpeter finch	Bucanetes githagineus	*
European greenfinch	Chloris chloris	
Twite	Linaria flavirostris	
Common linnet	Linaria cannabina	
Common redpoll	Acanthis flammea	
Lesser redpoll	Acanthis (flammea) cabaret	
Arctic redpoll	Acanthis (flammea) hornemanni	*
Two-barred crossbill	Loxia leucoptera	*
Parrot crossbill	Loxia pytyopsittacus	*
Red crossbill	Loxia curvirostra	
Citril finch	Serinus citrinella	*
European goldfinch	Carduelis carduelis	
European serin	Serinus serinus	
Eurasian siskin	Spinus spinus	

== Longspurs and snow buntings ==
Order: Passeriformes Family: Calcariidae

The Calcariidae are a group of passerine birds which had been traditionally grouped with the buntings, but differ in a number of respects and are usually found in open grassy areas.

Common name	Binomial	Status
Snow bunting	Plectrophenax nivalis	
Lapland bunting	Calcarius lapponicus	

== Old World buntings ==
Order: Passeriformes Family: Emberizidae

The buntings are a large family of passerine birds. They are seed-eating birds with distinctively shaped bills. Many bunting species have distinctive head patterns.

Common name	Binomial	Status
Reed bunting	Emberiza schoeniclus	
Yellow-browed bunting	Emberiza chrysophrys	*
Yellow-breasted bunting	Emberiza aureola	*
Little bunting	Emberiza pusilla	*
Rustic bunting	Emberiza rustica	*
Black-faced bunting	Emberiza spodocephala	*
Black-headed bunting	Emberiza melanocephala	*
Red-headed bunting	Emberiza bruniceps	*
Corn bunting	Emberiza calandra	
Rock bunting	Emberiza cia	*
Ortolan bunting	Emberiza hortulana	
Cirl bunting	Emberiza cirlus	*
Pine bunting	Emberiza leucocephalos	*
Yellowhammer	Emberiza citrinella	

== New World sparrows ==
Order: Passeriformes Family: Passerellidae

Until 2017, these species were considered part of the family Emberizidae. Most of the species are known as sparrows, but these birds are not closely related to the true sparrows which are in the family Passeridae. Many of these have distinctive head patterns.

Common name	Binomial	Status
Dark-eyed junco	Junco hyemalis	*
Savannah sparrow	Passerculus sandwichensis	*

== See also ==
- List of birds
- Lists of birds by region
