= Bobrovo =

Bobrovo (Russian: Боброво) is the name of several rural localities in Russia:

- Bobrovo (village, Primorsky District, Arkhangelsk Oblast), a village in Koskogorskoye Rural Settlement of Primorsky District, Arkhangelsk Oblast
- Bobrovo (settlement, Primorsky District, Arkhangelsk Oblast), a settlement in Bobrovo-Lyavlenskoye Rural Settlement of Primorsky District, Arkhangelsk Oblast

== See also ==
- Bobrowo (disambiguation)
