= Wielany =

- Village
- Location within Poland
- Coordinates: 52°16′N 18°27′E
- Country: Poland
- Voivodeship: Greater Poland
- County: Konin
- Gmina: Kramsk

Wielany [vjɛˈlanɨ] is a village in the administrative district of Gmina Kramsk, within Konin County, Greater Poland Voivodeship, in west-central Poland.

== People from Wielany ==
- Józef Adamczyk (10 December 1879, Wielany/Konin – 7 August 1942); in September 1941 as a 62-year-old running a small farm in the Polish district of Konin near the Warta, part of the Polish territory annexed by Germany as Reichsgau Wartheland after the invasion of Poland, married with three children, he - along with other inhabitant of the village of Borki, Konin County - he helped a 26-year old Soviet prisoner of war Fiodor Azarov who escaped from a railway transport and hid in Konin County for about two months. When in November 1941, 26-year-old Azarov was picked up by a German gendarmerie patrol following a denunciation, German police then arrested several Polish citizens who had sheltered and fed him, including Józef Adamczyk, who was accused of giving the escapees shelter in his stable for four days and feeding him. Adamczyk was sentenced to death on May 26, 1942 by the 2nd Senate of the German “People’s Court” for “damaging the welfare of the Reich in connection with treasonous favoring of the enemy” and murdered on August 7, 1942 in Berlin-Plötzensee.
