= Rumin =

Rumin may refer to:

- Rumin, Poland, a village near Stare Miasto
- Rumin, Iran, a village near Bam
- Rumin, Croatia, a village near Hrvace
