= Bobrowo =

Bobrowo may refer to the following places:

- Bobrowo, Gmina Golina in Greater Poland Voivodeship (west-central Poland)
- Bobrowo, Gmina Rzgów in Greater Poland Voivodeship (west-central Poland)
- Bobrowo, Kuyavian-Pomeranian Voivodeship (north-central Poland)
- Bobrowo, Warmian-Masurian Voivodeship (north Poland)
- Bobrowo, West Pomeranian Voivodeship (north-west Poland)

== See also ==
- Bobrovo (disambiguation)
