= Helenów Pierwszy =

- Village
- Location within Poland
- Coordinates: 52°24′N 19°36′E
- Country: Poland
- Voivodeship: Greater Poland
- County: Konin
- Gmina: Kramsk

Helenów Pierwszy [xɛˈlɛnuf ˈpjɛrfʂɨ] ("First Helenów") is a village in the administrative district of Gmina Kramsk, within Konin County, Greater Poland Voivodeship, in west-central Poland.
