= Barłogi, Konin County =

Barłogi
- Village
- Location within Poland
- Coordinates: 52°10′57″N 18°4′22″E
- Country: Poland
- Voivodeship: Greater Poland
- County: Konin
- Gmina: Rzgów
- Population: 200

Barłogi [barˈwɔɡi] is a village in the administrative district of Gmina Rzgów, within Konin County, Greater Poland Voivodeship, in west-central Poland.
