= Milin, Greater Poland Voivodeship =

Milin
- Village
- Location within Poland
- Coordinates: 52°14′24″N 18°25′49″E
- Country: Poland
- Voivodeship: Greater Poland
- County: Konin
- Gmina: Kramsk

Milin [ˈmilin] is a village in the administrative district of Gmina Kramsk, within Konin County, Greater Poland Voivodeship, in west-central Poland.
