= Witnica (disambiguation) =

Witnica may refer to the following places:

- Witnica, Greater Poland Voivodeship (west-central Poland)
- Witnica in Lubusz Voivodeship (west Poland)
- Witnica, West Pomeranian Voivodeship (north-west Poland)
