= Posada, Gmina Stare Miasto =

Posada
- Village
- Location within Poland
- Coordinates: 52°8′22″N 18°11′20″E
- Country: Poland
- Voivodeship: Greater Poland
- County: Konin
- Gmina: Stare Miasto

Posada [pɔˈsada] is a village in the administrative district of Gmina Stare Miasto, within Konin County, Greater Poland Voivodeship, in west-central Poland.
