= Drążno-Holendry =

- Village
- Location within Poland
- Coordinates: 52°13′1″N 18°25′6″E
- Country: Poland
- Voivodeship: Greater Poland
- County: Konin
- Gmina: Krzymów
- Population: 110

Drążno-Holendry [ˈdrɔ̃ʐnɔ xɔˈlɛndrɨ] is a village in the administrative district of Gmina Krzymów, within Konin County, Greater Poland Voivodeship, in west-central Poland.
