= Kruszyna, Greater Poland Voivodeship =

Kruszyna
- Village
- Location within Poland
- Coordinates: 52°07′30″N 18°12′42″E
- Country: Poland
- Voivodeship: Greater Poland
- County: Konin
- Gmina: Stare Miasto
- Time zone: UTC+1 (CET)
  - Summer (DST): UTC+2 (CEST)

Kruszyna [kruˈʂɨna] is a village in the administrative district of Gmina Stare Miasto, within Konin County, Greater Poland Voivodeship, in central Poland.
