= Rzgów Drugi =

- Village
- Location within Poland
- Coordinates: 52°08′48″N 18°03′20″E
- Country: Poland
- Voivodeship: Greater Poland
- County: Konin
- Gmina: Rzgów

Rzgów Drugi [ˈʐɡuf ˈdruɡi] ("Second Rzgów", as distinct from the neighbouring Rzgów Pierwszy, "First Rzgów") is a village in the administrative district of Gmina Rzgów, within Konin County, Greater Poland Voivodeship, in west-central Poland.
