= Przyjma, Greater Poland Voivodeship =

Przyjma
- Village
- Location within Poland
- Coordinates: 52°16′N 18°3′E
- Country: Poland
- Voivodeship: Greater Poland
- County: Konin
- Gmina: Golina

Przyjma [ˈpʂɨi̯ma] is a village in the administrative district of Gmina Golina, within Konin County, Greater Poland Voivodeship, in west-central Poland.
