= Rudzica, Greater Poland Voivodeship =

Rudzica
- Village
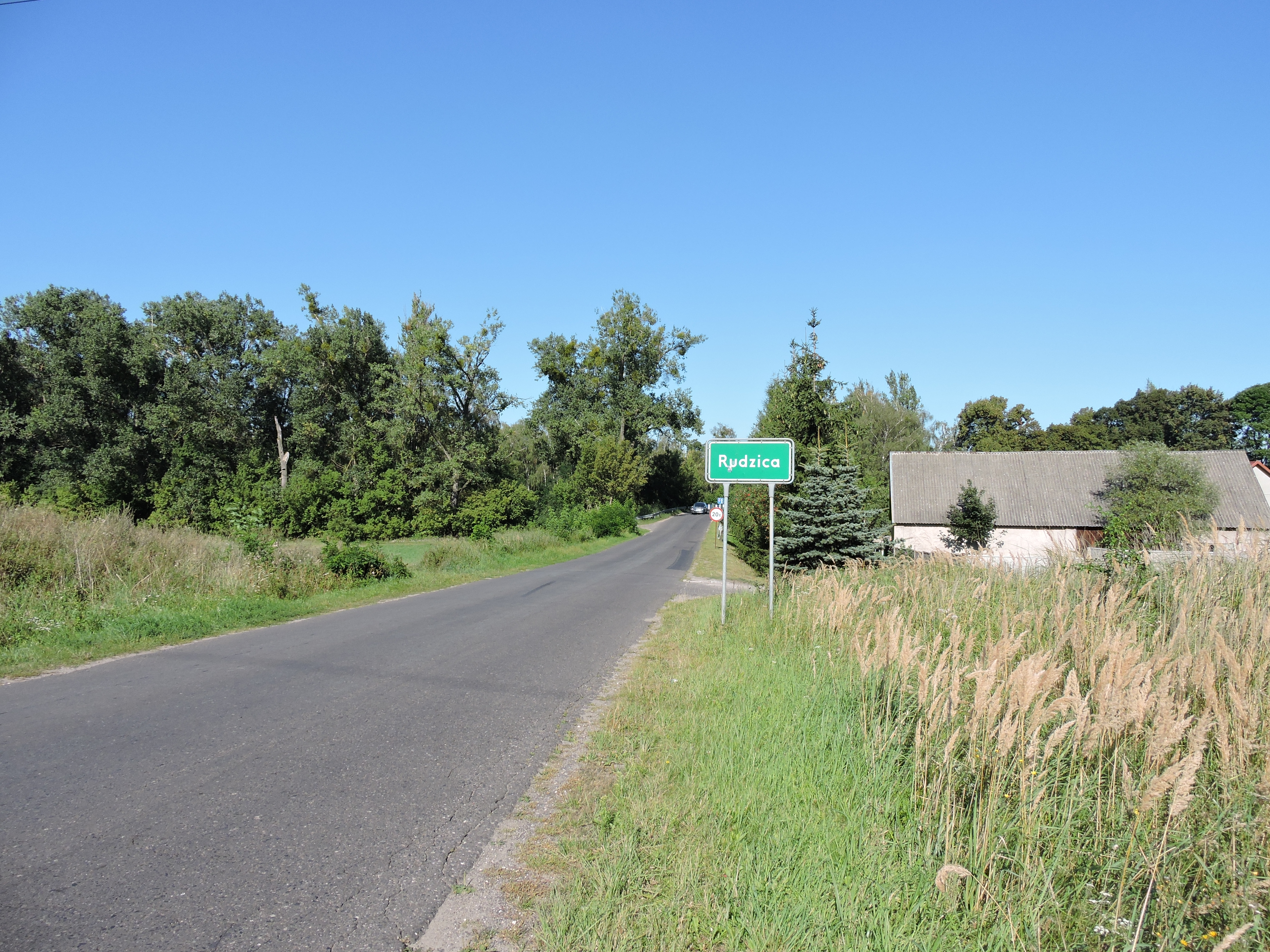
- Entrance to the village

- Location within Poland
- Coordinates: 52°15′N 18°19′E
- Country: Poland
- Voivodeship: Greater Poland
- County: Konin
- Gmina: Kramsk
- Time zone: UTC+1 (CET)
  - Summer (DST): UTC+2 (CEST)
- Vehicle registration: PKN

Rudzica [ruˈd͡ʑit͡sa] is a village in the administrative district of Gmina Kramsk, within Konin County, Greater Poland Voivodeship, in west-central Poland.
