= Siąszyce =

- Village
- Location within Poland
- Coordinates: 52°2′N 18°10′E
- Country: Poland
- Voivodeship: Greater Poland
- County: Konin
- Gmina: Rychwał

Siąszyce [ɕɔ̃ˈʂɨt͡sɛ] is a village in the administrative district of Gmina Rychwał, within Konin County, Greater Poland Voivodeship, in west-central Poland.
