= Żrekie =

- Village
- Location within Poland
- Coordinates: 52°13′04″N 18°22′13″E
- Country: Poland
- Voivodeship: Greater Poland
- County: Konin
- Gmina: Kramsk

Żrekie [ˈʐrɛkʲɛ] is a village in the administrative district of Gmina Kramsk, within Konin County, Greater Poland Voivodeship, in west-central Poland.
