= Nowe Paprockie Holendry =

- Village
- Location within Poland
- Coordinates: 52°11′35″N 18°25′02″E
- Country: Poland
- Voivodeship: Greater Poland
- County: Konin
- Gmina: Krzymów

Nowe Paprockie Holendry [ˈnɔvɛ paˈprɔt͡skʲɛ xɔˈlɛndrɨ] is a village in the administrative district of Gmina Krzymów, within Konin County, Greater Poland Voivodeship, in west-central Poland.
