= Golina-Kolonia =

- Village
- Location within Poland
- Coordinates: 52°15′19″N 18°06′55″E
- Country: Poland
- Voivodeship: Greater Poland
- County: Konin
- Gmina: Golina

Golina-Kolonia [ɡɔˈlina kɔˈlɔɲa] is a village in the administrative district of Gmina Golina, within Konin County, Greater Poland Voivodeship, in west-central Poland.
