= Grąblin =

- Village
- Location within Poland
- Coordinates: 52°17′N 18°21′E
- Country: Poland
- Voivodeship: Greater Poland
- County: Konin
- Gmina: Kramsk

Grąblin [ˈɡrɔmblin] is a village in the administrative district of Gmina Kramsk, within Konin County, Greater Poland Voivodeship, in west-central Poland.
