= Patrzyków, Greater Poland Voivodeship =

Patrzyków
- Village
- Location within Poland
- Coordinates: 52°14′N 18°23′E
- Country: Poland
- Voivodeship: Greater Poland
- County: Konin
- Gmina: Kramsk

Patrzyków [paˈtʂɨkuf] is a village in the administrative district of Gmina Kramsk, within Konin County, Greater Poland Voivodeship, in west-central Poland.
