= Bronisław Dąbrowski =

20th-century Polish Catholic bishop

The Right Reverend Bronisław Dąbrowski
- Auxiliary Bishop of Warsaw
- In office: 1961–1997

Orders
- Ordination: 10 June 1945
- Consecration: 24 November 1961 by Pope John XXIII

Personal details
- Born: 2 November 1917 Grodziec, Regency Kingdom of Poland
- Died: 25 December 1997 (aged 80) Warsaw, Poland
- Denomination: Roman Catholic Church

Bronisław Dąbrowski (2 November 1917 – 25 December 1997) was a Polish bishop of the Roman Catholic Church. He was auxiliary bishop of Warsaw 1962–1993 and general secretary of the Polish Episcopal Conference 1968–1993. In 1982 Dąbrowski became titular archbishop pro hac vice and in 1993 senior bishop of the Warsaw Archdiocese. Because of his function in the Episcopal Conference, Dąbrowski participated in political events of communist Poland. In December 1981 he wrote a letter to General Wojciech Jaruzelski in which he condemned the proclamation of the martial law in Poland and the subsequent repressions by the regime.

== Biography ==
Dąbrowski was born in Grodziec, now Poland, in 1917. At the age of 29 he took his first vows in the Orionine Fathers congregation and on 10 June 1945 became a Catholic priest. He conducted charitable work on behalf of war-injured children, helping to establish an orphanage home in Izbica Kujawska. In 1950 Dąbrowski became director of the Office of the Episcopate of Poland and a year later led the Secretariat of the Primate of Poland. Upon the recommendation of Cardinal Stefan Wyszyński, Pope John XXIII nominated Dąbrowski to the post of auxiliary bishop of Warsaw. The consecration ceremony took place in St. John's Cathedral in Warsaw on 25 March 1962.

From 1968 to 1993 Dąbrowski was secretary of the Polish Episcopal Conference. At the Vatican he represented the Polish Church in its efforts aimed at establishing a permanent Polish Church administration in the post-German "Recovered Territories". He routinely conducted discussions with representatives of the Polish communist party and government regarding this and other issues, insisting on the various rights and freedoms for the Polish Church and resisting repression in religious life and society. Dąbrowski participated in the crucial Magdalenka and Round Table negotiations which laid the groundwork for the systemic change in Poland (1988 and 1989).

In February 1993 Dąbrowski retired. He died on Christmas Day 1997 in Warsaw and was buried at the Powązki Cemetery.
