= Jabłków =

- Village
- Location within Poland
- Coordinates: 52°18′N 18°25′E
- Country: Poland
- Voivodeship: Greater Poland
- County: Konin
- Gmina: Kramsk
- Population: 220

Jabłków [ˈjabu̯kuf] is a village in the administrative district of Gmina Kramsk, within Konin County, Greater Poland Voivodeship, in west-central Poland.
