= Błonice =

- Village
- Location within Poland
- Coordinates: 52°6′N 18°5′E
- Country: Poland
- Voivodeship: Greater Poland
- County: Konin
- Gmina: Rzgów

Błonice [bwɔˈnit͡sɛ] is a village in the administrative district of Gmina Rzgów, within Konin County, Greater Poland Voivodeship, in west-central Poland.
