= Kraśnica =

Kraśnica may refer to the following places in Poland:

- Kraśnica, Greater Poland Voivodeship
- Kraśnica, Łódź Voivodeship
- Kraśnica, Szczecin
