= Drążek, Greater Poland Voivodeship =

Drążek
- Village
- Location within Poland
- Coordinates: 52°15′N 18°30′E
- Country: Poland
- Voivodeship: Greater Poland
- County: Konin
- Gmina: Kramsk

Drążek [ˈdrɔ̃ʐɛk] is a village in the administrative district of Gmina Kramsk, within Konin County, Greater Poland Voivodeship, in west-central Poland.
