= Głodowo, Greater Poland Voivodeship =

Głodowo
- Village
- Location within Poland
- Coordinates: 52°16′N 18°8′E
- Country: Poland
- Voivodeship: Greater Poland
- County: Konin
- Gmina: Golina

Głodowo [ɡwɔˈdɔvɔ] is a village in the administrative district of Gmina Golina, within Konin County, Greater Poland Voivodeship, in west-central Poland.
