= Krągola Pierwsza =

- Village
- Location within Poland
- Coordinates: 52°13′N 18°16′E
- Country: Poland
- Voivodeship: Greater Poland
- County: Konin
- Gmina: Stare Miasto

Krągola Pierwsza [krɔnˈɡɔla ˈpjɛrfʂa] is a village in the administrative district of Gmina Stare Miasto, within Konin County, Greater Poland Voivodeship, in west-central Poland.
