= Lipice, Poland =

Lipice
- Village
- Location within Poland
- Coordinates: 52°1′27″N 18°1′30″E
- Country: Poland
- Voivodeship: Greater Poland
- County: Konin
- Gmina: Grodziec
- Population: 100

Lipice [liˈpit͡sɛ] is a village in the administrative district of Gmina Grodziec, within Konin County, Greater Poland Voivodeship, in west-central Poland.
