= Przysieka, Konin County =

Przysieka
- Village
- Location within Poland
- Coordinates: 52°06′35″N 18°13′04″E
- Country: Poland
- Voivodeship: Greater Poland
- County: Konin
- Gmina: Stare Miasto

Przysieka [pʂɨˈɕɛka] is a village in the administrative district of Gmina Stare Miasto, within Konin County, Greater Poland Voivodeship, in west-central Poland.
