= Zaguźnica =

- Village
- Location within Poland
- Coordinates: 52°01′24″N 18°00′37″E
- Country: Poland
- Voivodeship: Greater Poland
- County: Konin
- Gmina: Grodziec

Zaguźnica [zaɡuʑˈnit͡sa] is a village in the administrative district of Gmina Grodziec, within Konin County, Greater Poland Voivodeship, in west-central Poland.
