= Rosocha, Konin County =

Rosocha
- Village
- Location within Poland
- Coordinates: 52°15′44″N 18°09′00″E
- Country: Poland
- Voivodeship: Greater Poland
- County: Konin
- Gmina: Golina

Rosocha [rɔˈsɔxa] is a village in the administrative district of Gmina Golina, within Konin County, Greater Poland Voivodeship, in west-central Poland.
