= Bystrzyca, Konin County =

Bystrzyca
- Village
- Location within Poland
- Coordinates: 52°5′N 18°0′E
- Country: Poland
- Voivodeship: Greater Poland
- County: Konin
- Gmina: Grodziec

Bystrzyca [bɨsˈtʂɨt͡sa] is a village in the administrative district of Gmina Grodziec, within Konin County, Greater Poland Voivodeship, in west-central Poland.
