= Niklas =

- Village
- Location within Poland
- Coordinates: 52°6′11″N 18°13′44″E
- Country: Poland
- Voivodeship: Greater Poland
- County: Konin
- Gmina: Stare Miasto

Niklas [ˈniklas] is a village in the administrative district of Gmina Stare Miasto, within Konin County, Greater Poland Voivodeship, in west-central Poland.
