= Golina =

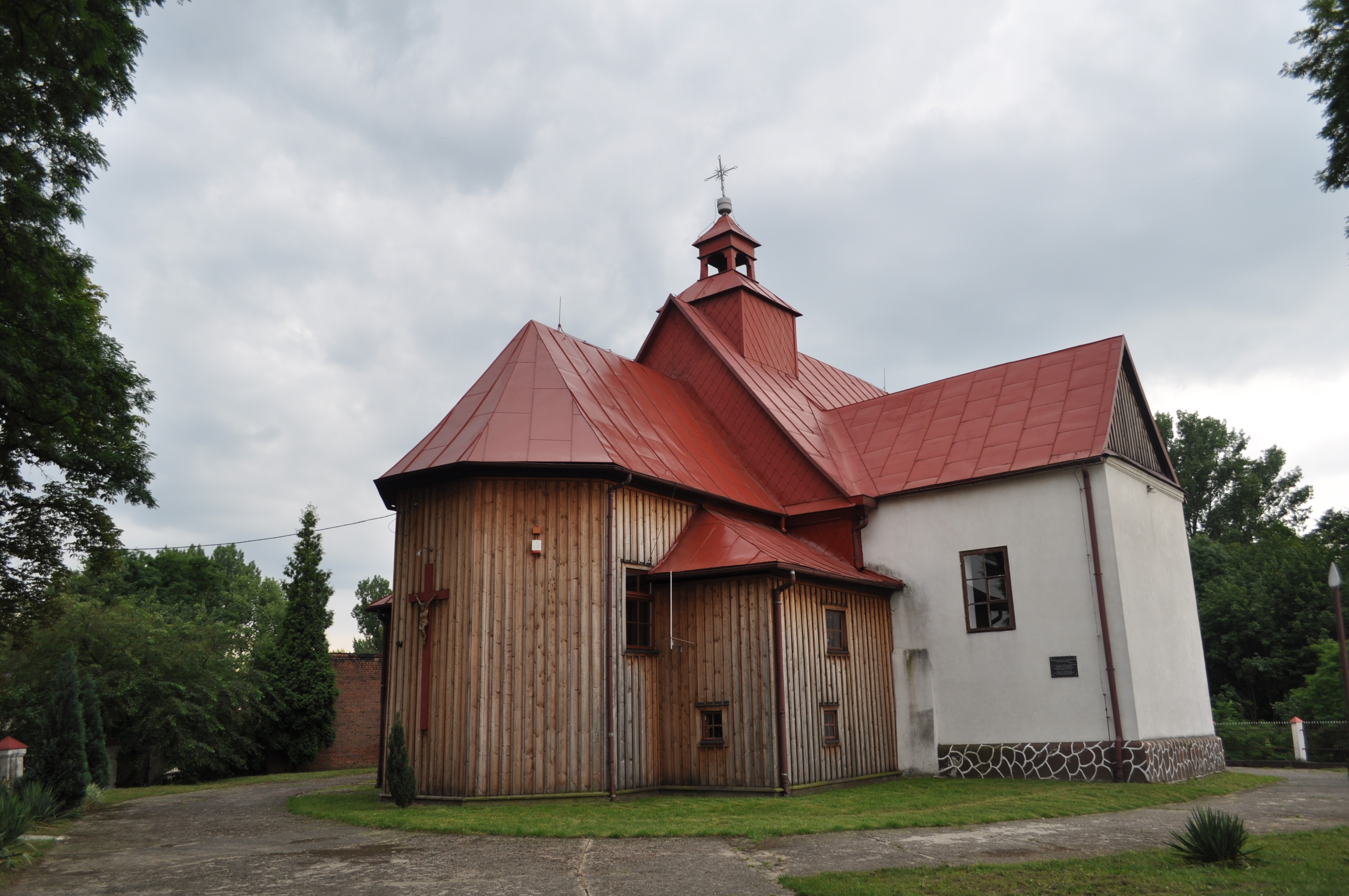
- Church of Saint James the Apostle

- Flag Coat of arms

- Location within Poland
- Coordinates: 52°15′48″N 18°6′43″E
- Country: Poland
- Voivodeship: Greater Poland
- County: Konin
- Gmina: Golina
- First mentioned: 12th century
- Town rights: 14th century

Area
  - Total: 3.57 km^{2} (1.38 sq mi)

Population (2010)
  - Total: 4,398
  - Density: 1,230/km^{2} (3,190/sq mi)
- Time zone: UTC+1 (CET)
  - Summer (DST): UTC+2 (CEST)
- Postal code: 62-590
- Vehicle registration: PKN
- Website: http://www.golina.pl/golina/

Golina [ɡɔˈlʲina] is a town in Konin County, Greater Poland Voivodeship, in central Poland, with 4,398 inhabitants (2010). It is located 12 km (7.5 mi) west from Konin.

== History ==
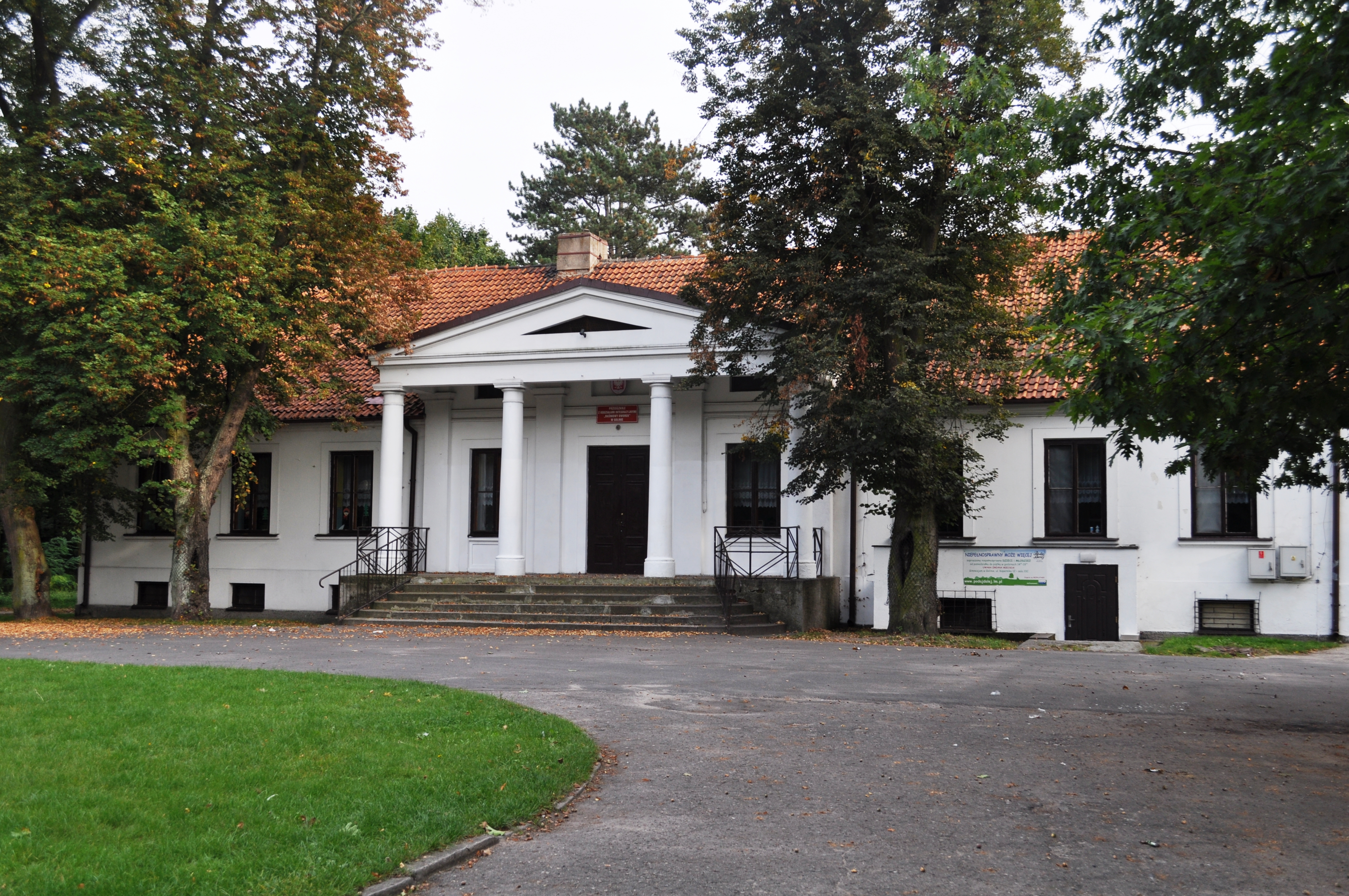
Historic manor house

The town was mentioned in the Gesta principum Polonorum, the oldest Polish chronicle from the early 12th century. It was granted town rights in the 14th century. It was a private town, administratively located in the Konin County in the Kalisz Voivodeship in the Greater Poland Province of the Kingdom of Poland. In 1793 Golina was annexed by Prussia as a result of the Second Partition of Poland. After the successful Greater Poland uprising of 1806, it was regained by Poles and included within the short-lived Polish Duchy of Warsaw, and after its dissolution in 1815 it became part of Congress Poland, later forcibly integrated with Imperial Russia. During the January Uprising, on March 16, 1863, a skirmish between Polish insurgents and Russian soldiers took place there. The Polish insurgent unit was attacked by Russian troops and forced to escape towards Lądek. As part of anti-Polish repressions after the fall of the uprising, Golina was deprived of its town rights in 1870, which it regained in 1921, after Poland regained independence.

During the occupation of Poland (World War II) the Germans expelled most of its populace to the General Government in the more eastern part of German-occupied Poland. The Polish resistance was active in Golina, and a weapons depot used by Polish partisans was located in the nearby forest. Walenty Orchowski, commander of the local unit of the Komenda Obrońców Polski organization, was arrested in 1941 and then tortured and murdered by the Gestapo in Inowrocław.

== Demographics ==
Historical population

Year	Pop.	±%
1871	1,625	—
1890	1,909	+17.5%
1897	1,784	−6.5%
1921	2,418	+35.5%
1931	2,578	+6.6%

Year	Pop.	±%
1939	2,902	+12.6%
1950	2,008	−30.8%
1960	1,837	−8.5%
2010	4,398	+139.4%
