= Tartak, Greater Poland Voivodeship =

Tartak
- Village
- Location within Poland
- Coordinates: 52°2′40″N 18°2′24″E
- Country: Poland
- Voivodeship: Greater Poland
- County: Konin
- Gmina: Grodziec
- Population: 70

Tartak [ˈtartak] is a village in the administrative district of Gmina Grodziec, within Konin County, Greater Poland Voivodeship, in west-central Poland.
