= Myśliborskie Holendry =

- Village
- Location within Poland
- Coordinates: 52°12′39″N 18°06′22″E
- Country: Poland
- Voivodeship: Greater Poland
- County: Konin
- Gmina: Golina

Myśliborskie Holendry [mɨɕliˈbɔrskʲɛ xɔˈlɛndrɨ] is a village in the administrative district of Gmina Golina, within Konin County, Greater Poland Voivodeship, in west-central Poland.
