= Lubiecz =

- Village
- Location within Poland
- Coordinates: 52°17′N 18°3′E
- Country: Poland
- Voivodeship: Greater Poland
- County: Konin
- Gmina: Golina
- Population: 206

Lubiecz [ˈlubjɛt͡ʂ] is a village in the administrative district of Gmina Golina, within Konin County, Greater Poland Voivodeship, in west-central Poland.
