= Myślibórz, Greater Poland Voivodeship =

Myślibórz
- Village
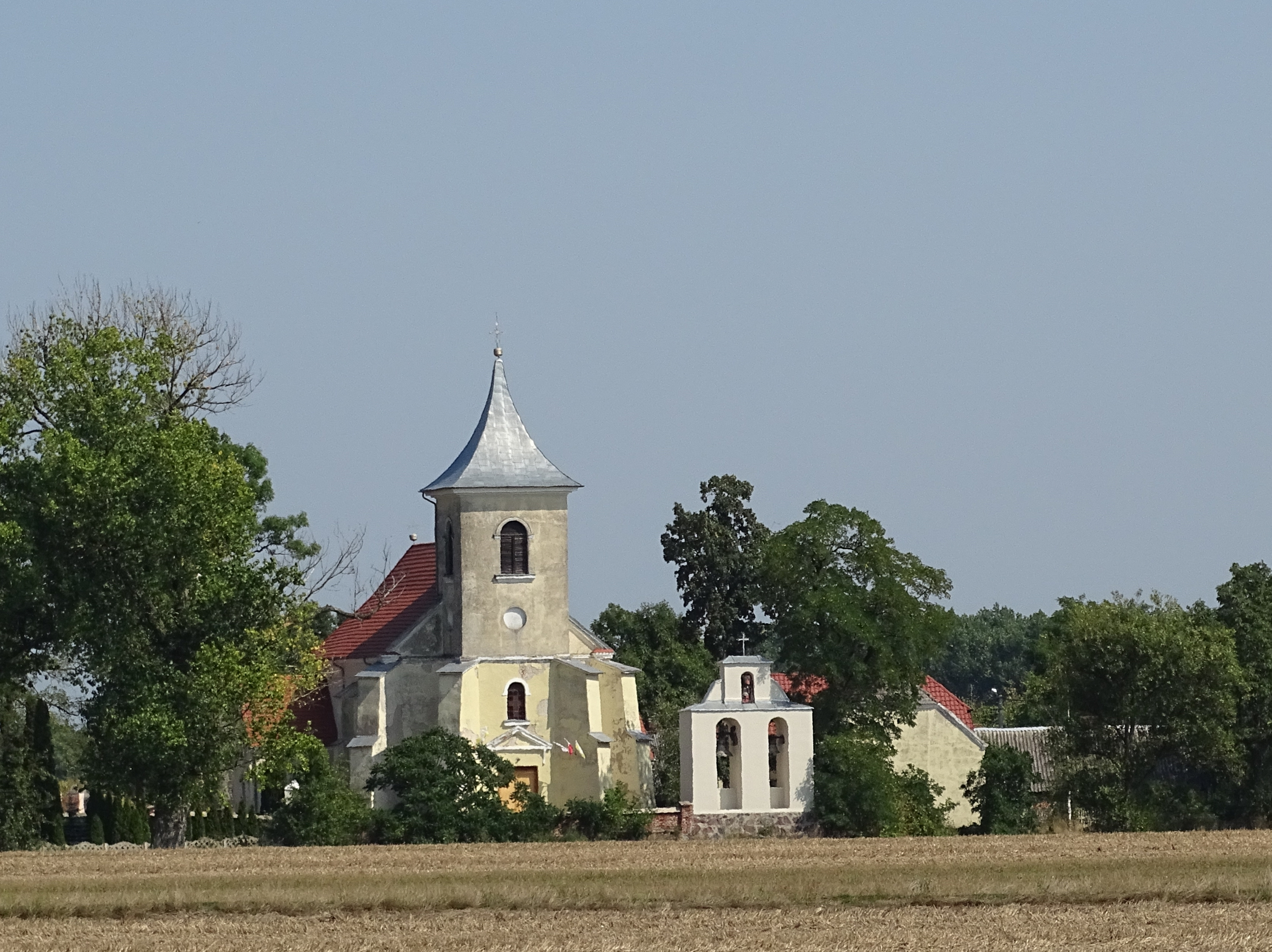
- Church of Saint Matthew.

- Location within Poland
- Coordinates: 52°14′N 18°4′E
- Country: Poland
- Voivodeship: Greater Poland
- County: Konin
- Gmina: Golina

Myślibórz [mɨˈɕlibuʂ] is a village in the administrative district of Gmina Golina, within Konin County, Greater Poland Voivodeship, in west-central Poland.
