= Biskupice-Kolonia, Greater Poland Voivodeship =

Biskupice-Kolonia
- Settlement
- Location within Poland
- Coordinates: 52°5′21″N 18°1′30″E
- Country: Poland
- Voivodeship: Greater Poland
- County: Konin
- Gmina: Grodziec

Biskupice-Kolonia [biskuˈpit͡sɛ kɔˈlɔɲa] is a settlement in the administrative district of Gmina Grodziec, within Konin County, Greater Poland Voivodeship, in west-central Poland.
