= Karsy, Konin County =

Karsy
- Village
- Location within Poland
- Coordinates: 52°9′N 18°14′E
- Country: Poland
- Voivodeship: Greater Poland
- County: Konin
- Gmina: Stare Miasto

Karsy [ˈkarsɨ] is a village in the administrative district of Gmina Stare Miasto, within Konin County, Greater Poland Voivodeship, in west-central Poland.
