= Lisiec Mały =

- Village
- Location within Poland
- Coordinates: 52°8′N 18°15′E
- Country: Poland
- Voivodeship: Greater Poland
- County: Konin
- Gmina: Stare Miasto

Lisiec Mały (Polish pronunciation: [ˈliɕɛts ˈmawɨ]) is a village in the administrative district of Gmina Stare Miasto, within Konin County, Greater Poland Voivodeship, in west-central Poland.
