= Paprotnia, Greater Poland Voivodeship =

Paprotnia
- Village
- Location within Poland
- Coordinates: 52°10′N 18°25′E
- Country: Poland
- Voivodeship: Greater Poland
- County: Konin
- Gmina: Krzymów

Paprotnia [paˈprɔtɲa] is a village in the administrative district of Gmina Krzymów, within Konin County, Greater Poland Voivodeship, in west-central Poland.
