= Piersk =

- Village
- Location within Poland
- Coordinates: 52°12′N 18°26′E
- Country: Poland
- Voivodeship: Greater Poland
- County: Konin
- Gmina: Krzymów
- Population: 100

Piersk [pjɛrsk] is a village in the administrative district of Gmina Krzymów, within Konin County, Greater Poland Voivodeship, in west-central Poland.

The Biechowy Ferry, a cable ferry, crosses the River Warta between Biechowy and Piersk.
