= Modła Księża =

- Village
- Location within Poland
- Coordinates: 52°8′44″N 18°12′42″E
- Country: Poland
- Voivodeship: Greater Poland
- County: Konin
- Gmina: Stare Miasto
- Population: 170

Modła Księża [ˈmɔdwa ˈkɕɛ̃ʐa] is a village in the administrative district of Gmina Stare Miasto, within Konin County, Greater Poland Voivodeship, in west-central Poland.
