= Kramsk-Łęgi =

- Village
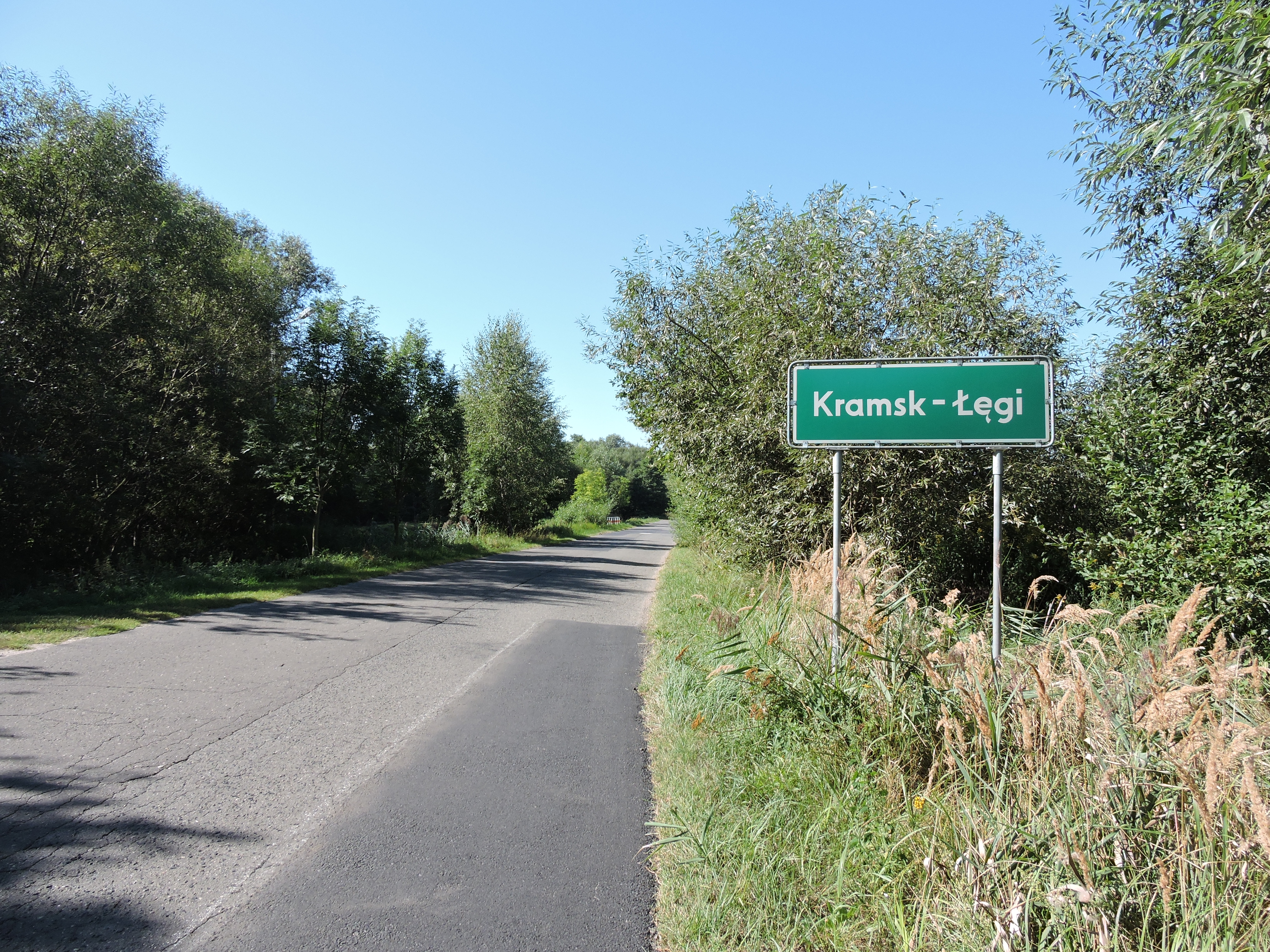
- Road sign in Kramsk-Łęgi

- Location within Poland
- Coordinates: 52°16′00″N 18°26′29″E
- Country: Poland
- Voivodeship: Greater Poland
- County: Konin
- Gmina: Kramsk

Kramsk-Łęgi ([ˈkramsk ˈwɛnɡi]) is a village in the administrative district of Gmina Kramsk, within Konin County, Greater Poland Voivodeship, in west central Poland.
