= Kurów, Konin County =

Village in Konin County, Greater Poland Voivodeship

Kurów
- Village
- Location within Poland
- Coordinates: 52°06′44″N 18°00′40″E
- Country: Poland
- Voivodeship: Greater Poland
- County: Konin
- Gmina: Rzgów

Kurów [ˈkuruf] is a village in the administrative district of Gmina Rzgów, within Konin County, Greater Poland Voivodeship, in west-central Poland.
