= Barce, Poland =

Barce in Poland may refer to:

- Barce, Greater Poland Voivodeship
- Barce, Nisko
