= Wardężyn =

- Village
- Location within Poland
- Coordinates: 52°05′51″N 18°06′49″E
- Country: Poland
- Voivodeship: Greater Poland
- County: Konin
- Gmina: Rychwał

Wardężyn [varˈdɛ̃ʐɨn] is a village in the administrative district of Gmina Rychwał, within Konin County, Greater Poland Voivodeship, in west-central Poland.
