= Konstantynów, Greater Poland Voivodeship =

Konstantynów
- Village
- Location within Poland
- Coordinates: 52°15′N 18°31′E
- Country: Poland
- Voivodeship: Greater Poland
- County: Konin
- Gmina: Kramsk

Konstantynów [kɔnstanˈtɨnuf] is a village in the administrative district of Gmina Kramsk, within Konin County, Greater Poland Voivodeship, in west-central Poland.
