= Grochowy =

- Village
- Location within Poland
- Coordinates: 52°2′6″N 18°12′3″E
- Country: Poland
- Voivodeship: Greater Poland
- County: Konin
- Gmina: Rychwał

Grochowy [ɡrɔˈxɔvɨ] is a village in the administrative district of Gmina Rychwał, within Konin County, Greater Poland Voivodeship, in west-central Poland.
