= Drążeń =

- Village
- Location within Poland
- Coordinates: 52°11′N 18°27′E
- Country: Poland
- Voivodeship: Greater Poland
- County: Konin
- Gmina: Krzymów

Drążeń [ˈdrɔ̃ʐɛɲ] is a village in the administrative district of Gmina Krzymów, within Konin County, Greater Poland Voivodeship, in west-central Poland.
