= Zalesie, Gmina Krzymów =

Zalesie
- Village
- Location within Poland
- Coordinates: 52°13′7″N 18°17′50″E
- Country: Poland
- Voivodeship: Greater Poland
- County: Konin
- Gmina: Krzymów

Zalesie [zaˈlɛɕɛ] is a village in the administrative district of Gmina Krzymów, within Konin County, Greater Poland Voivodeship, in west-central Poland.
