= Kramsk-Pole =

- Village
- Location within Poland
- Coordinates: 52°16′34″N 18°25′22″E
- Country: Poland
- Voivodeship: Greater Poland
- County: Konin
- Gmina: Kramsk

Kramsk-Pole [ˈkramsk ˈpɔlɛ] is a village in the administrative district of Gmina Kramsk, within Konin County, Greater Poland Voivodeship, in west-central Poland.
