= Franki, Greater Poland Voivodeship =

Franki
- Village
- Location within Poland
- Coordinates: 52°7′43″N 18°7′22″E
- Country: Poland
- Voivodeship: Greater Poland
- County: Konin
- Gmina: Rychwał

Franki [ˈfranki] is a village in the administrative district of Gmina Rychwał, within Konin County, Greater Poland Voivodeship, in west-central Poland.
