= Wycinki =

Wycinki may refer to the following places:

- Wycinki, Greater Poland Voivodeship (west-central Poland)
- Wycinki, Kuyavian-Pomeranian Voivodeship (north-central Poland)
- Wycinki, Masovian Voivodeship (east-central Poland)
- Wycinki, Pomeranian Voivodeship (north Poland)
