= Izabelin, Gmina Krzymów =

Village in Greater Poland Voivodeship, Poland

Izabelin
- Village
- Location within Poland
- Coordinates: 52°08′21″N 18°18′52″E
- Country: Poland
- Voivodeship: Greater Poland
- County: Konin
- Municipality: Krzymów

Population (2022)
  - Total: 5
- Time zone: UTC+1 (CET)
  - Summer (DST): UTC+2 (CEST)
- Postal code: PL-62-513
- Area code: +48 63
- Vehicle registration: PKN

Izabelin (Polish: [izaˈbɛ.lin]) is a village in Greater Poland Voivodeship, Poland, located in the municipality of Krzymów within Konin County. In 2022, it had 5 residents.
