= Chójki, Gmina Krzymów =

Chójki
- Village
- Location within Poland
- Coordinates: 52°12′40″N 18°17′34″E
- Country: Poland
- Voivodeship: Greater Poland
- County: Konin
- Gmina: Krzymów

Chójki [ˈxui̯ki] is a village in the administrative district of Gmina Krzymów, within Konin County, Greater Poland Voivodeship, in west-central Poland.
