= Stary Borowiec =

- Village
- Location within Poland
- Coordinates: 52°00′02″N 18°03′37″E
- Country: Poland
- Voivodeship: Greater Poland
- County: Konin
- Gmina: Grodziec

Stary Borowiec [ˈstarɨ bɔˈrɔvjɛt͡s] is a village in the administrative district of Gmina Grodziec, within Konin County, Greater Poland Voivodeship, in west-central Poland.
