= Osiecza Pierwsza =

- Village
- Location within Poland
- Coordinates: 52°11′9″N 18°6′36″E
- Country: Poland
- Voivodeship: Greater Poland
- County: Konin
- Gmina: Rzgów

Osiecza Pierwsza [ɔˈɕɛt͡ʂa ˈpjɛrfʂa] is a village in the administrative district of Gmina Rzgów, within Konin County, Greater Poland Voivodeship, in west-central Poland.
