= Wojciechowo =

Wojciechowo may refer to the following places:

- Wojciechowo, Jarocin County in Greater Poland Voivodeship (west-central Poland)
- Wojciechowo, Gmina Rzgów in Greater Poland Voivodeship (west-central Poland)
- Wojciechowo, Masovian Voivodeship (east-central Poland)
- Wojciechowo, Koło County in Greater Poland Voivodeship (west-central Poland)
- Wojciechowo, Gmina Wierzbinek in Greater Poland Voivodeship (west-central Poland)
- Wojciechowo, Oborniki County in Greater Poland Voivodeship (west-central Poland)
- Wojciechowo, Wolsztyn County in Greater Poland Voivodeship (west-central Poland)
- Wojciechowo, Pomeranian Voivodeship (north Poland)
- Wojciechowo, Warmian-Masurian Voivodeship (north Poland)
