= Brzeźniak =

Brzeźniak may refer to the following places:

- Brzeźniak, Greater Poland Voivodeship (west-central Poland)
- Brzeźniak, West Pomeranian Voivodeship (north-west Poland)
- Brzeźniak, Wałcz County in West Pomeranian Voivodeship (north-west Poland)
