= Teresina, Greater Poland Voivodeship =

Teresina
- Village
- Location within Poland
- Coordinates: 52°9′N 18°19′E
- Country: Poland
- Voivodeship: Greater Poland
- County: Konin
- Gmina: Krzymów

Teresina [tɛrɛˈɕina] is a village in the administrative district of Gmina Krzymów, within Konin County, Greater Poland Voivodeship, in west-central Poland.
