= Sługocinek =

- Village
- Location within Poland
- Coordinates: 52°13′N 18°3′E
- Country: Poland
- Voivodeship: Greater Poland
- County: Konin
- Gmina: Golina

Sługocinek [swuɡɔˈt͡ɕinɛk] is a village in the administrative district of Gmina Golina, within Konin County, Greater Poland Voivodeship, in west-central Poland.
