= Nowy Krzymów =

- Village
- Location within Poland
- Coordinates: 52°11′14″N 18°26′31″E
- Country: Poland
- Voivodeship: Greater Poland
- County: Konin
- Gmina: Krzymów

Nowy Krzymów [ˈnɔvɨ ˈkʂɨmuf] is a village in the administrative district of Gmina Krzymów, within Konin County, Greater Poland Voivodeship, in west-central Poland.
