= Dębicz, Konin County =

Dębicz
- Village
- Location within Poland
- Coordinates: 52°16′N 18°25′E
- Country: Poland
- Voivodeship: Greater Poland
- County: Konin
- Gmina: Kramsk
- Population: 440

Dębicz [ˈdɛmbit͡ʂ] is a village in the administrative district of Gmina Kramsk, within Konin County, Greater Poland Voivodeship, in west-central Poland.
