= Czarnybród =

- Village
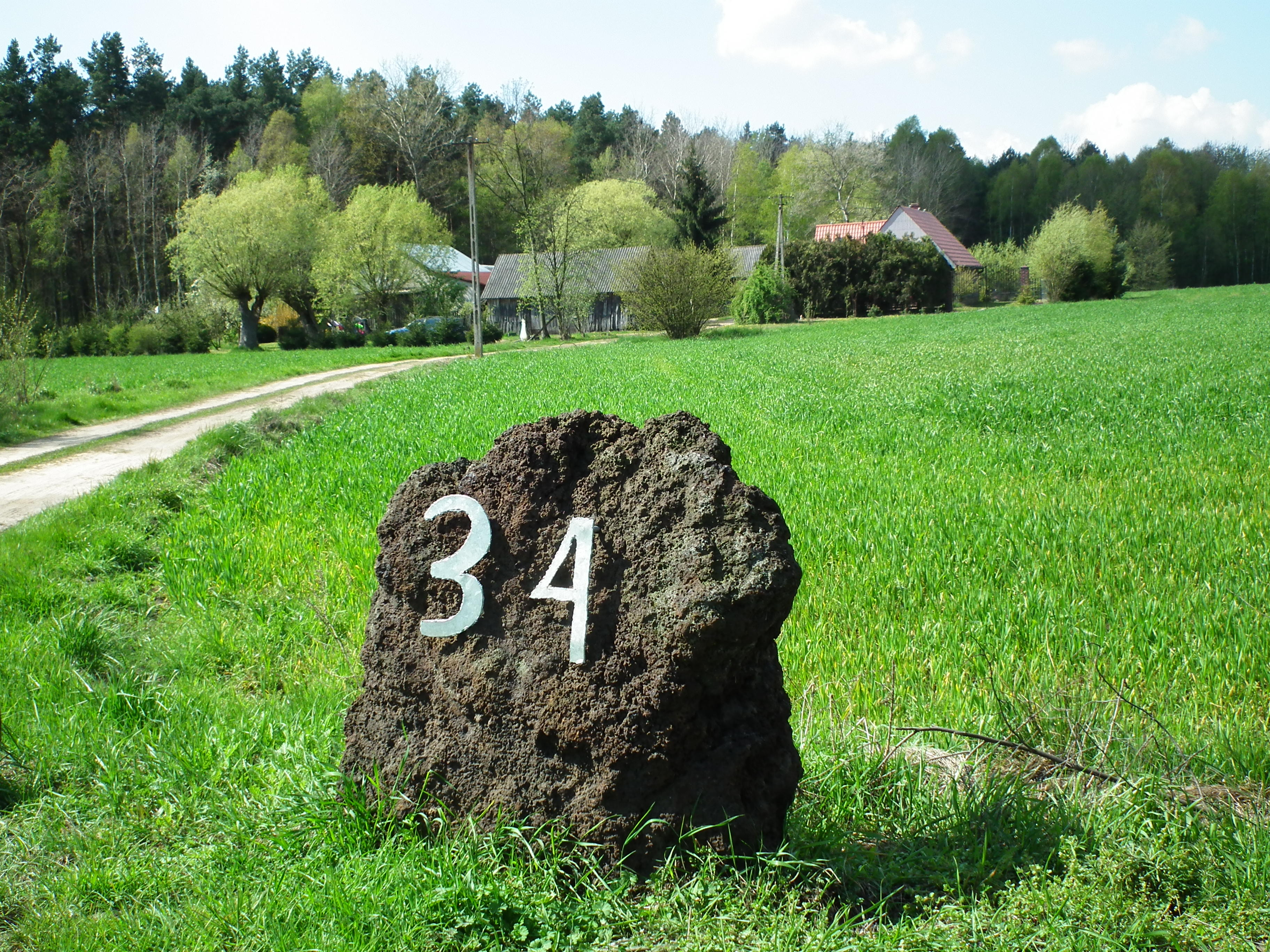
- The village of Czarnybród in the Pyzdry Forest

- Location within Poland
- Coordinates: 52°05′00″N 17°57′26″E
- Country: Poland
- Voivodeship: Greater Poland
- County: Konin
- Gmina: Grodziec

Czarnybród [t͡ʂarˈnɨbrut] is a village in the administrative district of Gmina Grodziec, within Konin County, Greater Poland Voivodeship, in west-central Poland.
