= Biała, Konin County =

Biała
- Village
- Location within Poland
- Coordinates: 52°4′25″N 18°1′14″E
- Country: Poland
- Voivodeship: Greater Poland
- County: Konin
- Gmina: Grodziec
- Population: 180

Biała [ˈbjawa] is a village in the administrative district of Gmina Grodziec, within Konin County, Greater Poland Voivodeship, in west-central Poland.
