= Janów, Konin County =

Janów
- Village
- Location within Poland
- Coordinates: 52°2′41″N 18°5′27″E
- Country: Poland
- Voivodeship: Greater Poland
- County: Konin
- Gmina: Grodziec
- Population: 80

Janów [ˈjanuf] is a village in the administrative district of Gmina Grodziec, within Konin County, Greater Poland Voivodeship, in west-central Poland.
