= Głodno, Konin County =

Głodno
- Village
- Location within Poland
- Coordinates: 52°11′N 18°22′E
- Country: Poland
- Voivodeship: Greater Poland
- County: Konin
- Gmina: Krzymów

Głodno [ˈɡwɔdnɔ] is a village in the administrative district of Gmina Krzymów, within Konin County, Greater Poland Voivodeship, in west-central Poland.
