= Grabowa, Greater Poland Voivodeship =

Grabowa
- Village
- Location within Poland
- Coordinates: 52°5′N 18°9′E
- Country: Poland
- Voivodeship: Greater Poland
- County: Konin
- Gmina: Rychwał

Grabowa [ɡraˈbɔva] is a village in the administrative district of Gmina Rychwał in Konin County, Greater Poland Voivodeship in west-central Poland.
