= Rysiny, Konin County =

Rysiny
- Village
- Location within Poland
- Coordinates: 52°17′10″N 18°29′16″E
- Country: Poland
- Voivodeship: Greater Poland
- County: Konin
- Gmina: Kramsk

Rysiny [rɨˈɕinɨ] is a village in the administrative district of Gmina Kramsk, within Konin County, Greater Poland Voivodeship, in west-central Poland.
