= Nowe Grądy =

- Village
- Location within Poland
- Coordinates: 52°00′10″N 18°06′32″E
- Country: Poland
- Voivodeship: Greater Poland
- County: Konin
- Gmina: Grodziec

Nowe Grądy [ˈnɔvɛ ˈɡrɔndɨ] is a village in the administrative district of Gmina Grodziec, within Konin County, Greater Poland Voivodeship, in west-central Poland.
