= Podgor (disambiguation) =

Podgor is a village in Montenegro

Podgor or Podgór may also refer to:

- Podgór, a village in Poland
- Ellen Podgor (fl. 2000s–2010s), American expert on white-collar crime

== See also ==
- Prizrenski Podgor, geographic region of Kosovo
