= Helenów Drugi =

- Village
- Location within Poland
- Coordinates: 52°19′1″N 18°23′38″E
- Country: Poland
- Voivodeship: Greater Poland
- County: Konin
- Gmina: Kramsk

Helenów Drugi [xɛˈlɛnuf ˈdruɡi] is a village in the administrative district of Gmina Kramsk, within Konin County, Greater Poland Voivodeship, in west-central Poland.
