= Ignacew =

- Village
- Location within Poland
- Coordinates: 52°10′1″N 18°21′24″E
- Country: Poland
- Voivodeship: Greater Poland
- County: Konin
- Gmina: Krzymów

Ignacew [iɡˈnat͡sɛf] is a village in the administrative district of Gmina Krzymów, within Konin County, Greater Poland Voivodeship, in west-central Poland.
