= Bożatki =

- Village
- Location within Poland
- Coordinates: 52°7′N 18°3′E
- Country: Poland
- Voivodeship: Greater Poland
- County: Konin
- Gmina: Rzgów
- Population: 260

Bożatki [bɔˈʐatki] is a village in the administrative district of Gmina Rzgów, within Konin County, Greater Poland Voivodeship, in west-central Poland.
