= Strumyk, Gmina Kramsk =

Strumyk
- Village
- Location within Poland
- Coordinates: 52°16′29″N 18°27′41″E
- Country: Poland
- Voivodeship: Greater Poland
- County: Konin
- Gmina: Kramsk

Strumyk [ˈstrumɨk] is a village in the administrative district of Gmina Kramsk, within Konin County, Greater Poland Voivodeship, in west-central Poland.
