= Żychlin, Greater Poland Voivodeship =

Żychlin
- Village
- Location within Poland
- Coordinates: 52°11′N 18°16′E
- Country: Poland
- Voivodeship: Greater Poland
- County: Konin
- Gmina: Stare Miasto
- Population: 1,200

Żychlin [ˈʐɨxlin] is a village in the administrative district of Gmina Stare Miasto, within Konin County, Greater Poland Voivodeship, in west-central Poland.
