= Nowy Czarków =

- Village
- Location within Poland
- Coordinates: 52°14′20″N 18°22′26″E
- Country: Poland
- Voivodeship: Greater Poland
- County: Konin
- Gmina: Kramsk

Nowy Czarków [ˈnɔvɨ ˈt͡ʂarkuf] is a village in the administrative district of Gmina Kramsk, within Konin County, Greater Poland Voivodeship, in west-central Poland.
