= Stare Grądy =

- Village
- Location within Poland
- Coordinates: 52°01′01″N 18°06′39″E
- Country: Poland
- Voivodeship: Greater Poland
- County: Konin
- Gmina: Grodziec

Stare Grądy [ˈstarɛ ˈɡrɔndɨ] is a village in the administrative district of Gmina Grodziec, within Konin County, Greater Poland Voivodeship, in west-central Poland.
