= Kramsk-Łazy =

- Village
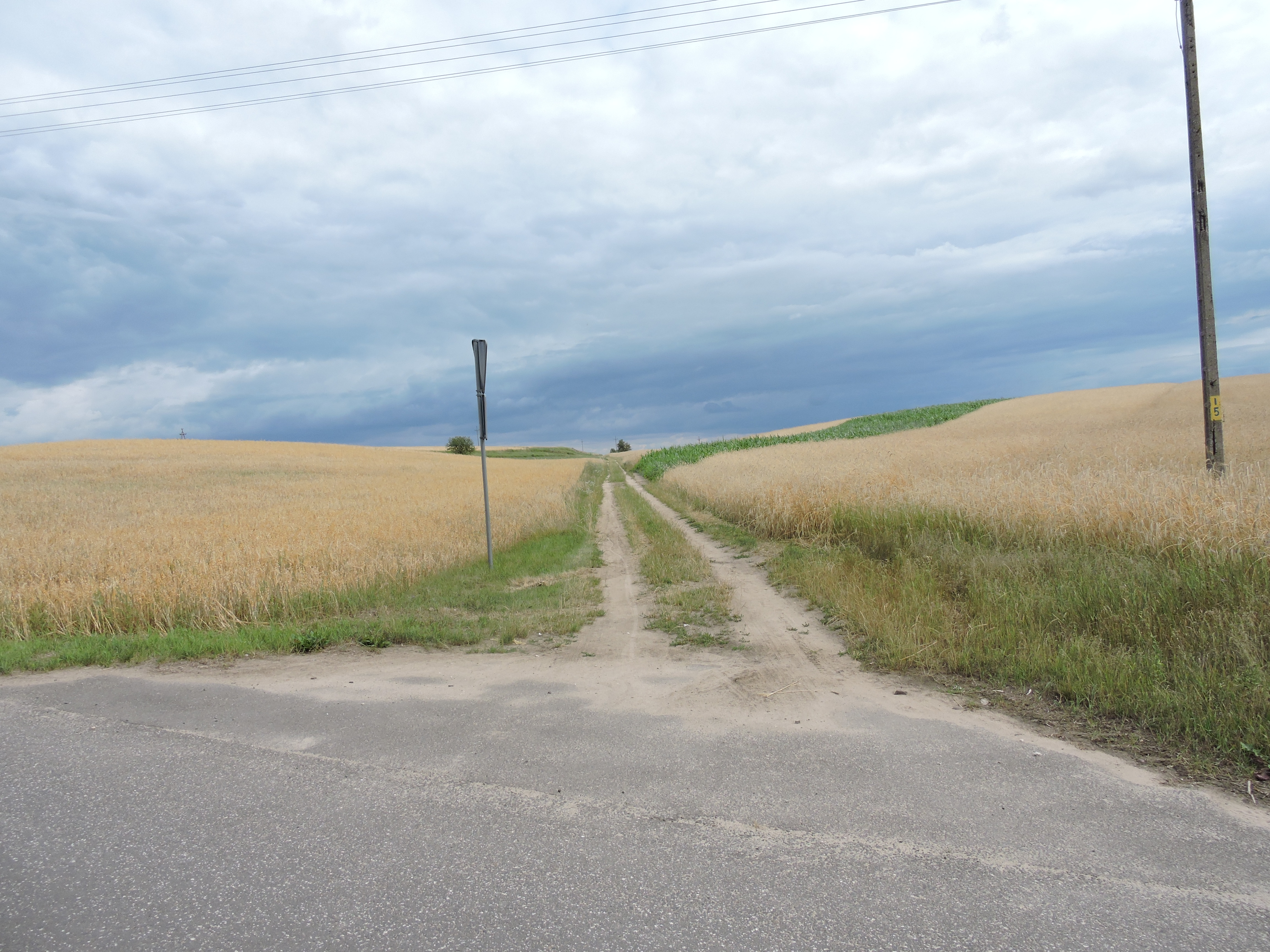
- Fields in Kramsk-Łazy

- Location within Poland
- Coordinates: 52°16′59″N 18°24′57″E
- Country: Poland
- Voivodeship: Greater Poland
- County: Konin
- Gmina: Kramsk

Kramsk-Łazy [ˈkramsk ˈwazɨ] is a village in the administrative district of Gmina Kramsk, within Konin County, Greater Poland Voivodeship, in west-central Poland.
