= Smolnik, Greater Poland Voivodeship =

Village in Greater Poland Voivodeship

Smolnik
- Village
- Location within Poland
- Coordinates: 52°9′12″N 18°23′1″E
- Country: Poland
- Voivodeship: Greater Poland
- County: Konin
- Gmina: Krzymów
- Population: 200

Smolnik [ˈsmɔlɲik] is a village in the administrative district of Gmina Krzymów, within Konin County, Greater Poland Voivodeship, in west-central Poland.
