= Chrusty, Konin County =

Chrusty
- Village
- Location within Poland
- Coordinates: 52°14′N 18°2′E
- Country: Poland
- Voivodeship: Greater Poland
- County: Konin
- Gmina: Golina

Chrusty [ˈxrustɨ] is a village in the administrative district of Gmina Golina, within Konin County, Greater Poland Voivodeship, in west-central Poland.
