= Główiew =

- Village
- Location within Poland
- Coordinates: 52°7′N 18°11′E
- Country: Poland
- Voivodeship: Greater Poland
- County: Konin
- Gmina: Stare Miasto

Główiew [ˈɡwuvjɛf] is a village in the administrative district of Gmina Stare Miasto, within Konin County, Greater Poland Voivodeship, in west-central Poland.
