= Rybie, Greater Poland Voivodeship =

Rybie
- Village
- Location within Poland
- Coordinates: 52°1′N 18°12′E
- Country: Poland
- Voivodeship: Greater Poland
- County: Konin
- Gmina: Rychwał

Rybie [ˈrɨbjɛ] is a village in the administrative district of Gmina Rychwał, within Konin County, Greater Poland Voivodeship, in west-central Poland.
