= Biskupice, Konin County =

Biskupice
- Village
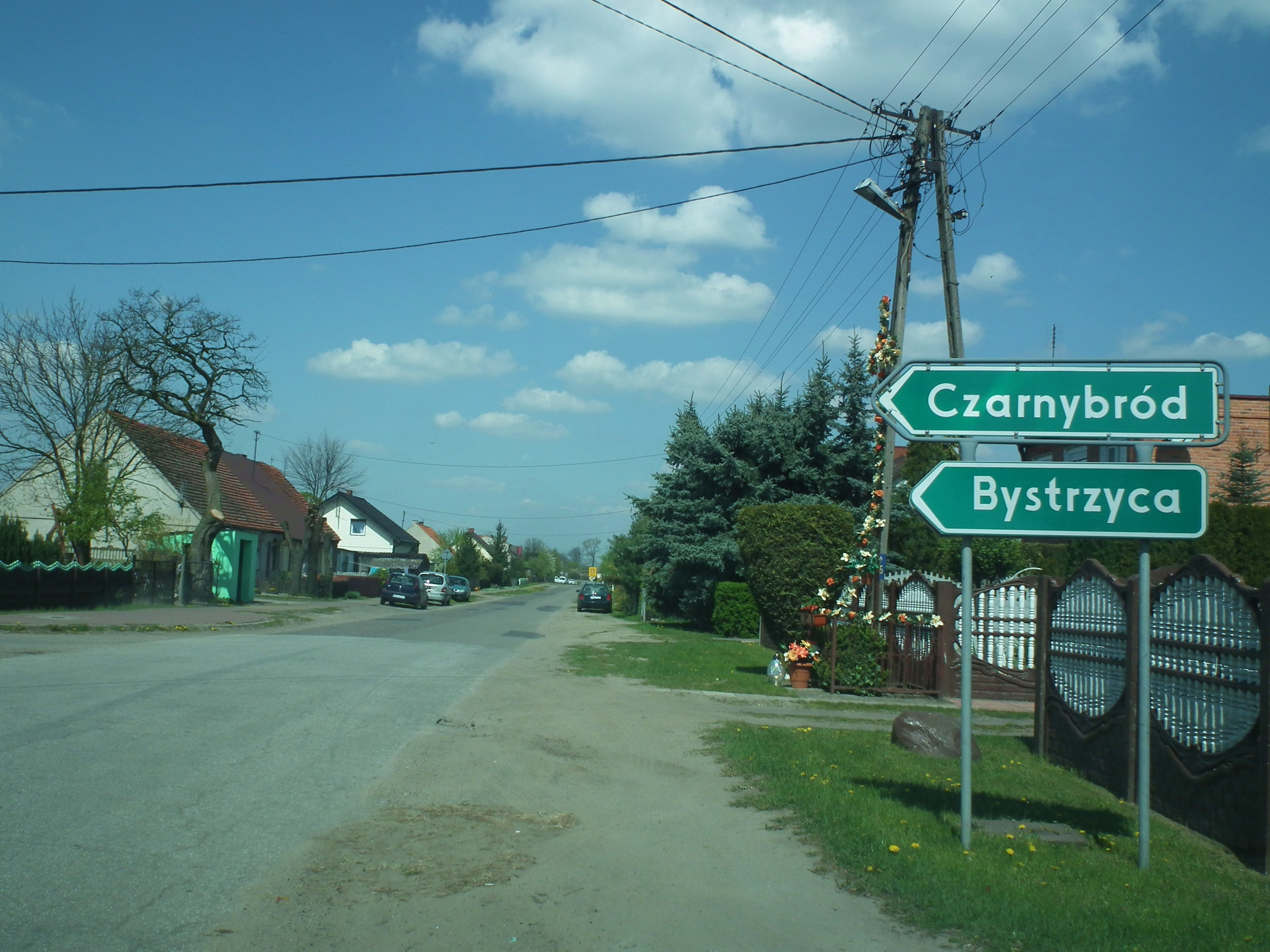

- Location within Poland
- Coordinates: 52°5′38″N 18°0′39″E
- Country: Poland
- Voivodeship: Greater Poland
- County: Konin
- Gmina: Grodziec

Biskupice [biskuˈpit͡sɛ] (German Bischofsdorf) is a village in the administrative district of Gmina Grodziec, within Konin County, Greater Poland Voivodeship, in west-central Poland.
