= Stara Ciświca =

- Village
- Location within Poland
- Coordinates: 52°0′29″N 17°59′15″E
- Country: Poland
- Voivodeship: Greater Poland
- County: Konin
- Gmina: Grodziec
- Population: 320

Stara Ciświca [ˈstara t͡ɕiɕˈfit͡sa] is a village in the administrative district of Gmina Grodziec, within Konin County, Greater Poland Voivodeship, in west-central Poland.
