= Biała-Kolonia =

- Village
- Location within Poland
- Coordinates: 52°4′31″N 18°0′11″E
- Country: Poland
- Voivodeship: Greater Poland
- County: Konin
- Gmina: Grodziec
- Population: 120

Biała-Kolonia [ˈbjawa kɔˈlɔɲa] is a village in the administrative district of Gmina Grodziec, within Konin County, Greater Poland Voivodeship, in west-central Poland.
