= Stara Huta, Greater Poland Voivodeship =

Stara Huta
- Village
- Location within Poland
- Coordinates: 52°0′59″N 18°2′22″E
- Country: Poland
- Voivodeship: Greater Poland
- County: Konin
- Gmina: Grodziec
- Population: 20

Stara Huta [ˈstara ˈxuta] is a village in the administrative district of Gmina Grodziec, within Konin County, Greater Poland Voivodeship, in west-central Poland.
