= Kawnice =

- Village
- Location within Poland
- Coordinates: 52°14′50″N 18°9′1″E
- Country: Poland
- Voivodeship: Greater Poland
- County: Konin
- Gmina: Golina
- Population: 1,149
- Website: http://kawnice.pl

Kawnice [kavˈnit͡sɛ] is a village in the administrative district of Gmina Golina, within Konin County, Greater Poland Voivodeship, in west-central Poland.
