= Babia =

Babia may refer to:

- Babia (beetle), a genus of leaf beetles
- Babia, Poland, a village in west-central Poland
- Babia, Spain, a Spanish comarca in province of León
- Babia, Congo, a village in Democratic Republic of the Congo
- Babia 93, a 1993 album by Sajjad Ali
- "Babia" (song), a track from that album
- Babia Góra or Babia hora, a mountain on the Polish–Slovak border
- Babia Góra National Park
- Babia Góra, Podlaskie Voivodeship, a village in north-east Poland
