= Barbarka =

Barbarka refers to the following places in Poland:

- Barbarka, Greater Poland Voivodeship, village
- Barbarka, Lesser Poland Voivodeship, village
- Barbarka, Toruń, district of Toruń
