= Józefowo, Gmina Rzgów =

Józefowo
- Village
- Location within Poland
- Coordinates: 52°8′53″N 18°5′34″E
- Country: Poland
- Voivodeship: Greater Poland
- County: Konin
- Gmina: Rzgów

Józefowo (Polish pronunciation: [juzɛˈfɔvɔ]) is a village in the administrative district of Gmina Rzgów, within Konin County, Greater Poland Voivodeship, in west-central Poland.
