= Rożek Brzeziński =

- Village
- Location within Poland
- Coordinates: 52°12′13″N 18°22′20″E
- Country: Poland
- Voivodeship: Greater Poland
- County: Konin
- Gmina: Krzymów
- Population: 40

Rożek Brzeziński [ˈrɔʐɛk bʐɛˈʑiɲski] is a village in the administrative district of Gmina Krzymów, within Konin County, Greater Poland Voivodeship, in west-central Poland.
