= Zastruże =

Zastruże may refer to the following places in Poland:

- Zastruże, Lower Silesian Voivodeship (south-west Poland)
- Zastruże, Masovian Voivodeship (east-central Poland)
- Zastruże, Greater Poland Voivodeship (west-central Poland)
