= Jaroszewice Grodzieckie =

- Village
- Location within Poland
- Coordinates: 52°03′48″N 18°07′03″E
- Country: Poland
- Voivodeship: Greater Poland
- County: Konin
- Gmina: Rychwał

Jaroszewice Grodzieckie [jarɔʂɛˈvit͡sɛ ɡrɔˈd͡ʑɛt͡skʲɛ] is a village in the administrative district of Gmina Rychwał, within Konin County, Greater Poland Voivodeship, in west-central Poland.
