= Genowefa, Gmina Krzymów =

Genowefa
- Village
- Location within Poland
- Coordinates: 52°10′06″N 18°26′46″E
- Country: Poland
- Voivodeship: Greater Poland
- County: Konin
- Gmina: Krzymów
- Vehicle registration: PKN

Genowefa ([ɡɛnɔˈvɛfa]) is a village in the administrative district of Gmina Krzymów, within Konin County, Greater Poland Voivodeship, in west-central Poland.
