= Sławsk, Konin County =

Sławsk
- Village
- Location within Poland
- Coordinates: 52°12′N 18°8′E
- Country: Poland
- Voivodeship: Greater Poland
- County: Konin
- Gmina: Rzgów

Sławsk [swafsk] is a village in the administrative district of Gmina Rzgów, within Konin County, Greater Poland Voivodeship, in west-central Poland.
