= Mądroszki =

- Village
- Location within Poland
- Coordinates: 52°07′16″N 18°05′11″E
- Country: Poland
- Voivodeship: Greater Poland
- County: Konin
- Gmina: Rzgów

Mądroszki [mɔnˈdrɔʂki] is a village in the administrative district of Gmina Rzgów, within Konin County, Greater Poland Voivodeship, west-central Poland.
