= Branno, Greater Poland Voivodeship =

Branno
- Village
- Location within Poland
- Coordinates: 52°11′N 18°11′E
- Country: Poland
- Voivodeship: Greater Poland
- County: Konin
- Gmina: Rzgów

Branno [ˈbrannɔ] is a village in the administrative district of Gmina Rzgów, within Konin County, Greater Poland Voivodeship, in west-central Poland.
