= Królików Czwarty =

- Village
- Location within Poland
- Coordinates: 52°03′47″N 18°01′54″E
- Country: Poland
- Voivodeship: Greater Poland
- County: Konin
- Gmina: Grodziec

Królików Czwarty [kruˈlikuf ˈt͡ʂfartɨ] is a village in the administrative district of Gmina Grodziec, within Konin County, Greater Poland Voivodeship, in west-central Poland.
