= Dąbroszyn, Greater Poland Voivodeship =

Dąbroszyn
- Village
- Location within Poland
- Coordinates: 52°6′N 18°8′E
- Country: Poland
- Voivodeship: Greater Poland
- County: Konin
- Gmina: Rychwał
- Population: 550

Dąbroszyn ([dɔmˈbrɔʂɨn]; German: 1943–45 Eichenhagen) is a village in the administrative district of Gmina Rychwał, within Konin County, Greater Poland Voivodeship, in west-central Poland.
