= Janowice, Gmina Stare Miasto =

Janowice
- Village
- Location within Poland
- Coordinates: 52°09′54″N 18°15′30″E
- Country: Poland
- Voivodeship: Greater Poland
- County: Konin
- Gmina: Stare Miasto

Janowice [janɔˈvit͡sɛ] is a village in the administrative district of Gmina Stare Miasto, within Konin County, Greater Poland Voivodeship, in west-central Poland.
