= Izabelin, Gmina Kramsk =

Izabelin
- Village
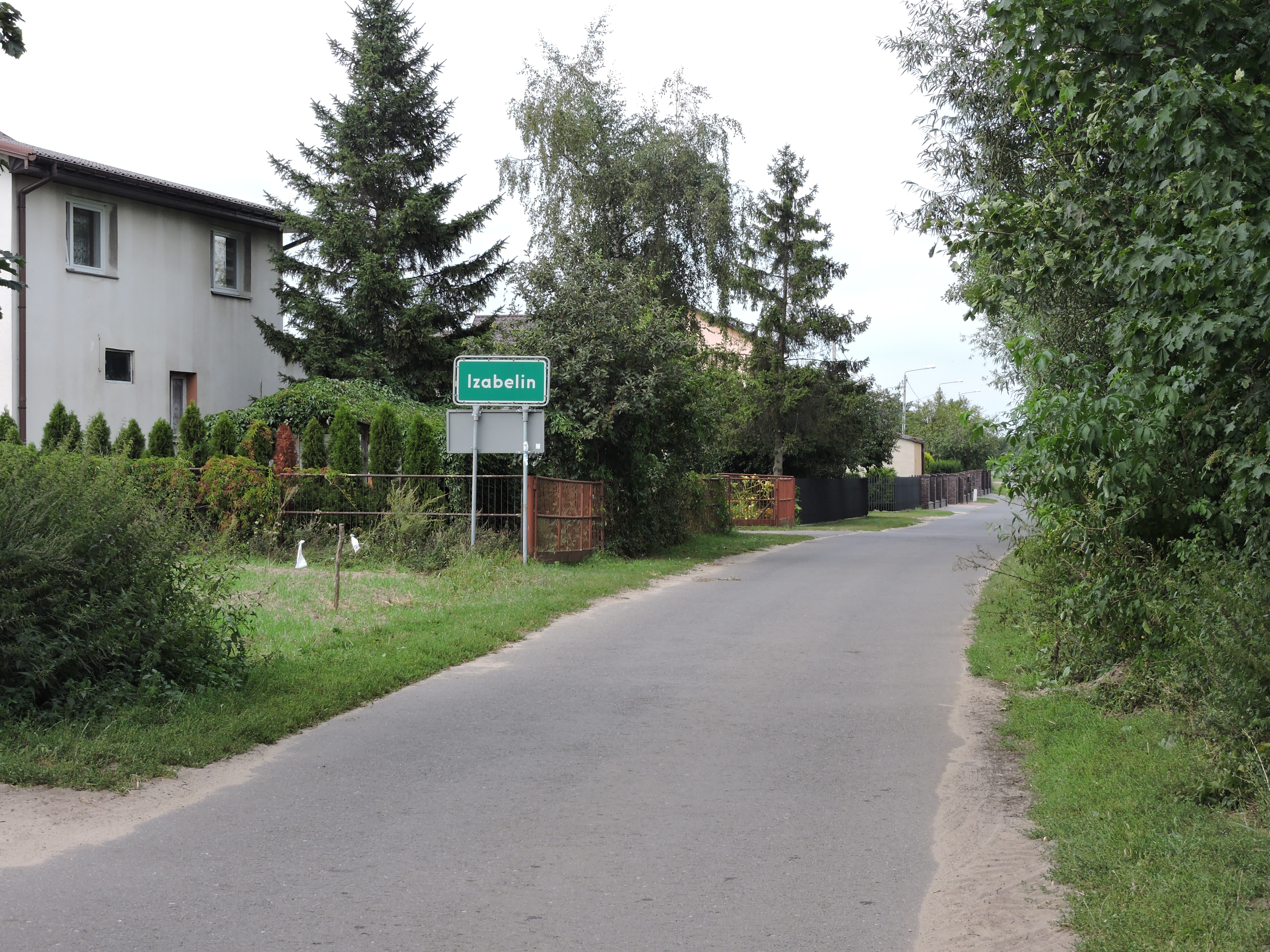

- Location within Poland
- Coordinates: 52°15′58″N 18°20′23″E
- Country: Poland
- Voivodeship: Greater Poland
- County: Konin
- Gmina: Kramsk

Izabelin [izaˈbɛlin] is a village in the administrative district of Gmina Kramsk, within Konin County, Greater Poland Voivodeship, in west-central Poland.
