= Tomaszew, Konin County =

Tomaszew
- Village
- Location within Poland
- Coordinates: 52°08′03″N 18°11′52″E
- Country: Poland
- Voivodeship: Greater Poland
- County: Konin
- Gmina: Stare Miasto

Tomaszew [tɔˈmaʂɛf] is a village in the administrative district of Gmina Stare Miasto, within Konin County, Greater Poland Voivodeship, in west-central Poland.
