= Żdżary =

Żdżary may refer to the following places:

- Żdżary, Konin County in Greater Poland Voivodeship (west-central Poland)
- Żdżary, Turek County in Greater Poland Voivodeship (west-central Poland)
- Żdżary, Września County in Greater Poland Voivodeship (west-central Poland)
- Żdżary, Lesser Poland Voivodeship (south Poland)
- Żdżary, Łowicz County in Łódź Voivodeship (central Poland)
- Żdżary, Opoczno County in Łódź Voivodeship (central Poland)
- Żdżary, Wieruszów County in Łódź Voivodeship (central Poland)
- Żdżary, Lublin Voivodeship (east Poland)
- Żdżary, Grójec County in Masovian Voivodeship (east-central Poland)
- Żdżary, Radom County in Masovian Voivodeship (east-central Poland)
- Żdżary, Subcarpathian Voivodeship (south-east Poland)
- Zdżary (formerly Żdżary), Subcarpathian Voivodeship (south-east Poland)
- Żdżary, West Pomeranian Voivodeship (north-west Poland)
