= Goździków, Greater Poland Voivodeship =

Goździków
- Village
- Location within Poland
- Coordinates: 52°08′38″N 18°00′52″E
- Country: Poland
- Voivodeship: Greater Poland
- County: Konin
- Gmina: Rzgów

Goździków [ɡɔʑˈd͡ʑikuf] is a village in the administrative district of Gmina Rzgów, within Konin County, Greater Poland Voivodeship, in west-central Poland.
