= Stary Tartak =

- Settlement
- Location within Poland
- Coordinates: 52°02′41″N 18°02′23″E
- Country: Poland
- Voivodeship: Greater Poland
- County: Konin
- Gmina: Grodziec

Stary Tartak [ˈstarɨ ˈtartak] is a settlement in the administrative district of Gmina Grodziec, within Konin County, Greater Poland Voivodeship, in west-central Poland.
