= Nowa Huta, Greater Poland Voivodeship =

Nowa Huta
- Village
- Location within Poland
- Coordinates: 52°1′9″N 18°1′59″E
- Country: Poland
- Voivodeship: Greater Poland
- County: Konin
- Gmina: Grodziec
- Population: 30

Nowa Huta [ˈnɔva ˈxuta] is a village in the administrative district of Gmina Grodziec, within Konin County, Greater Poland Voivodeship, in west-central Poland.
