= Nowy Borowiec =

- Village
- Location within Poland
- Coordinates: 52°0′33″N 18°0′39″E
- Country: Poland
- Voivodeship: Greater Poland
- County: Konin
- Gmina: Grodziec
- Population: 10

Nowy Borowiec [ˈnɔvɨ bɔˈrɔvjɛt͡s] is a village in the administrative district of Gmina Grodziec, within Konin County, Greater Poland Voivodeship, in west-central Poland.
