= Rzgów Pierwszy =

- Village
- Location within Poland
- Coordinates: 52°9′N 18°3′E
- Country: Poland
- Voivodeship: Greater Poland
- County: Konin
- Gmina: Rzgów

Rzgów Pierwszy [ˈʐɡuf ˈpjɛrfʂɨ] ("First Rzgów", as distinct from the neighbouring Rzgów Drugi, "Second Rzgów") is a village in Konin County, Greater Poland Voivodeship, in west-central Poland. It is the seat of the gmina (administrative district) called Gmina Rzgów.
