= Rumin, Poland =

Rumin
- Village
- Location within Poland
- Coordinates: 52°13′N 18°12′E
- Country: Poland
- Voivodeship: Greater Poland
- County: Konin
- Gmina: Stare Miasto
- Population (approx.): 600

Rumin [ˈrumin] is a village in the administrative district of Gmina Stare Miasto, within Konin County, Greater Poland Voivodeship, in west-central Poland.

The village has an approximate population of 600.
