= Gmina Stare Miasto =

Gmina Stare Miasto Stare Miasto Commune
- Gmina
- Flag Coat of arms

- Coordinates (Stare Miasto): 52°11′0″N 18°12′51″E
- Country: Poland
- Voivodeship: Greater Poland
- County: Konin County
- Seat: Stare Miasto

Area
  - Total: 97.82 km^{2} (37.77 sq mi)

Population (2006)
  - Total: 10,355
  - Density: 105.9/km^{2} (274.2/sq mi)
- Website: http://www.stare-miasto.pl

Gmina Stare Miasto is a rural gmina (administrative district) in Konin County, Greater Poland Voivodeship, in west-central Poland. Its seat is the village of Stare Miasto, which lies approximately 6 kilometres (4 mi) south-west of Konin and 92 km (57 mi) east of the regional capital Poznań.

The gmina covers an area of 97.82 square kilometres (37.8 sq mi), and as of 2006 its total population is 10,355. It is located within the Central European Time Zone (GMT+1).

== Villages ==
Gmina Stare Miasto contains the villages and settlements of Barczygłów, Bicz, Bicz-Ostatki, Główiew, Janowice, Karsy, Kazimierów, Krągola, Krągola Pierwsza, Kruszyna, Lisiec Mały, Lisiec Nowy, Lisiec Wielki, Modła Królewska, Modła Księża, Modła-Kolonia, Niklas, Nowiny, Posada, Posoka, Przysieka, Rumin, Tomaszew, Trójka, Żdżary, Żdżary-Kolonia, Zgoda and Żychlin.

== Neighbouring gminas ==
Gmina Stare Miasto is bordered by the city of Konin and by the gminas of Golina, Krzymów, Rychwał, Rzgów and Tuliszków.
