= Barbarka, Greater Poland Voivodeship =

Village in Greater Poland Voivodeship, Poland

Barbarka
- Village
- Location within Poland
- Coordinates: 52°13′58″N 18°1′42″E
- Country: Poland
- Voivodeship: Greater Poland
- County: Konin
- Gmina: Golina

Population
  - Total: 150
- Time zone: UTC+1 (CET)
  - Summer (DST): UTC+2 (CEST)
- Vehicle registration: PKN

Barbarka [barˈbarka] is a village in the administrative district of Gmina Golina, within Konin County, Greater Poland Voivodeship, in west-central Poland.

== History ==
According to the 1921 Polish census, the population was entirely Polish by nationality, and Catholic by confession.

Following the joint German-Soviet invasion of Poland, which started World War II in September 1939, the village was occupied by Germany until 1945. In 1941, the German gendarmerie carried out expulsions of Poles, whose houses and farms were then handed over to German colonists as part of the Lebensraum policy.
