= Bobrowo, Gmina Golina =

Bobrowo
- Village
- Location within Poland
- Coordinates: 52°13′16″N 18°3′9″E
- Country: Poland
- Voivodeship: Greater Poland
- County: Konin
- Gmina: Golina

Bobrowo [bɔˈbrɔvɔ] is a village in the administrative district of Gmina Golina, within Konin County, Greater Poland Voivodeship, in west-central Poland.
