= Brzeźniak, Greater Poland Voivodeship =

Brzeźniak
- Village
- Location within Poland
- Coordinates: 52°17′32″N 18°06′02″E
- Country: Poland
- Voivodeship: Greater Poland
- County: Konin
- Gmina: Golina

Brzeźniak [ˈbʐɛʑɲak] is a village in the administrative district of Gmina Golina, within Konin County, Greater Poland Voivodeship, in west-central Poland.
