= Kramsk =

- Village
- Location within Poland
- Coordinates: 52°15′N 18°25′E
- Country: Poland
- Voivodeship: Greater Poland
- County: Konin
- Gmina: Kramsk
- Population: 1,200

Kramsk [kramsk] is a village in Konin County, in west-central Poland. It is the seat of the gmina (administrative district) called Gmina Kramsk.
