= Gmina Kramsk =

Gmina Kramsk Kramsk Commune
- Gmina
- Flag Coat of arms

- Coordinates (Kramsk): 52°15′54″N 18°25′0″E
- Country: Poland
- Voivodeship: Greater Poland
- County: Konin County
- Seat: Kramsk

Area
  - Total: 131.78 km^{2} (50.88 sq mi)

Population (2006)
  - Total: 10,133
  - Density: 76.893/km^{2} (199.15/sq mi)
- Website: http://www.kramsk.pl/

Gmina Kramsk is a rural gmina (administrative district) in Konin County, Greater Poland Voivodeship, in west-central Poland. Its seat is the village of Kramsk, which lies approximately 12 kilometres (7 mi) north-east of Konin and 104 km (65 mi) east of the regional capital Poznań.

The gmina covers an area of 131.78 square kilometres (50.9 sq mi), and as of 2006 its total population is 10,133.

== Villages ==
Gmina Kramsk contains the villages and settlements of Anielew, Barce, Bilczew, Borki, Brzózki, Dębicz, Drążek, Grąblin, Helenów Drugi, Helenów Pierwszy, Izabelin, Jabłków, Konstantynów, Kramsk, Kramsk-Łazy, Kramsk-Łęgi, Kramsk-Pole, Ksawerów, Lichnowo, Milin, Nowy Czarków, Osowce, Pąchów, Patrzyków, Podgór, Rudzica, Rysiny, Strumyk, Święciec, Święte, Wielany, Wola Podłężna, Wysokie and Żrekie.

== Neighbouring gminas ==
Gmina Kramsk is bordered by the city of Konin and by the gminas of Koło, Kościelec, Krzymów, Osiek Mały, Ślesin and Sompolno.
