= Gmina Krzymów =

Gmina Krzymów Krzymów Commune
- Gmina
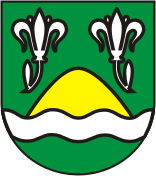
- Coat of arms

- Coordinates (Krzymów): 52°12′N 18°26′E
- Country: Poland
- Voivodeship: Greater Poland
- County: Konin County
- Seat: Krzymów

Area
  - Total: 92.68 km^{2} (35.78 sq mi)

Population (2006)
  - Total: 7,074
  - Density: 76.33/km^{2} (197.7/sq mi)
- Website: http://www.krzymow.nowoczesnagmina.pl

Gmina Krzymów is a rural gmina (administrative district) in Konin County, Greater Poland Voivodeship, in west-central Poland. Its seat is the village of Krzymów, which lies approximately 12 kilometres (7 mi) east of Konin and 106 km (66 mi) east of the regional capital Poznań.

The gmina covers an area of 92.68 square kilometres (35.8 sq mi), and as of 2006 its total population is 7,074.

== Villages ==
Gmina Krzymów contains the villages and settlements of Adamów, Borowo, Brzezińskie Holendry, Brzeźno, Chójki, Drążeń, Drążno-Holendry, Genowefa, Głodno, Ignacew, Izabelin, Kałek, Krzymów, Nowe Paprockie Holendry, Nowy Krzymów, Paprotnia, Piersk, Potażniki, Rożek Brzeziński, Smolnik, Stare Paprockie Holendry, Szczepidło, Teresina and Zalesie.

== Neighbouring gminas ==
Gmina Krzymów is bordered by the city of Konin and by the gminas of Kościelec, Kramsk, Stare Miasto, Tuliszków and Władysławów.
