= Stare Miasto, Konin County =

Stare Miasto
- Village
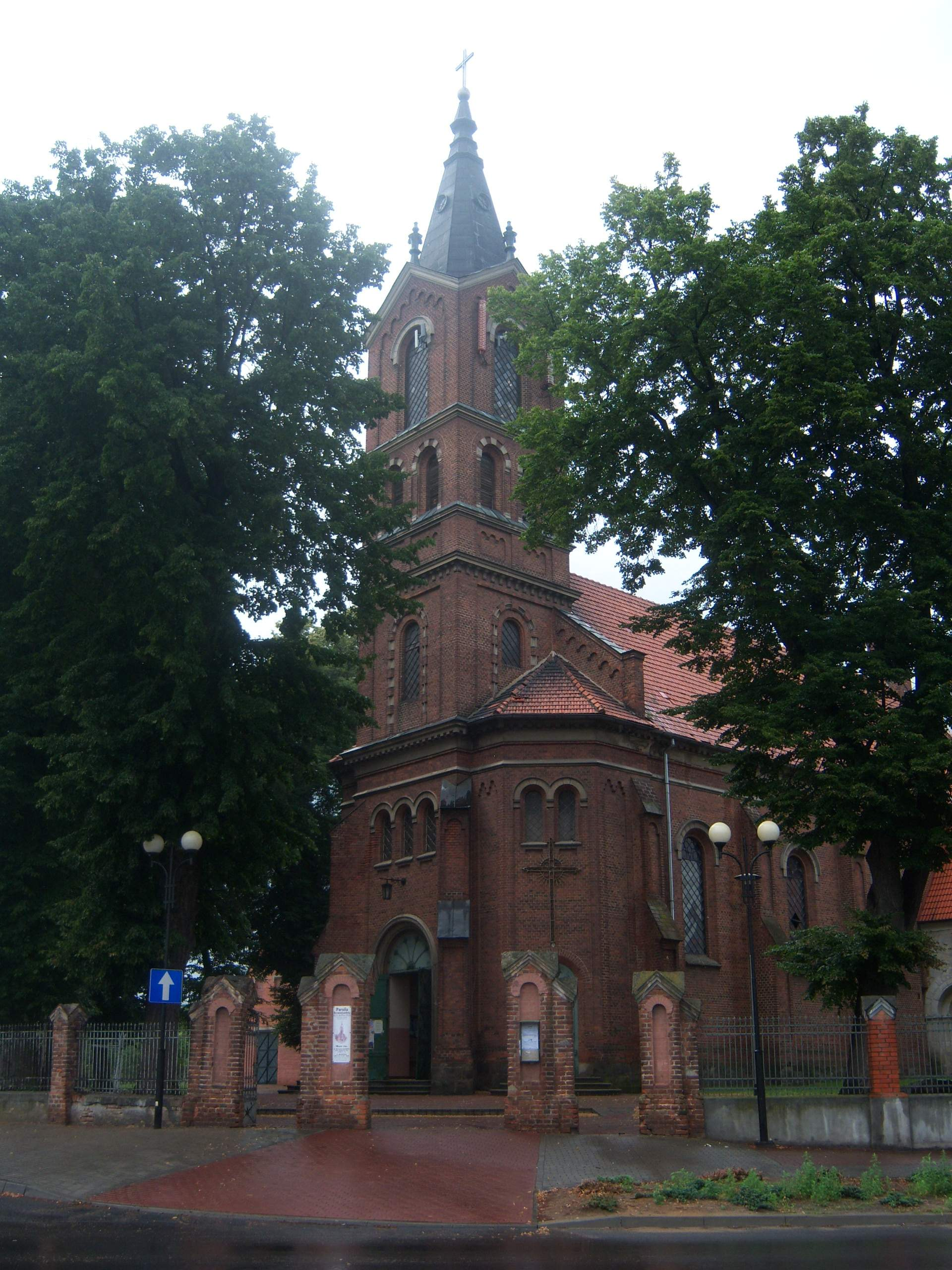
- Church of Saints Peter and Paul

- Location within Poland
- Coordinates: 52°11′0″N 18°12′51″E
- Country: Poland
- Voivodeship: Greater Poland
- County: Konin
- Gmina: Stare Miasto

Population (approx.)
  - Total: 1,500

Stare Miasto (Polish pronunciation: [ˈstarɛ ˈmjastɔ]) is a village in Konin County, Greater Poland Voivodeship, in west-central Poland. It is the seat of the gmina (administrative district) called Gmina Stare Miasto. The village has an approximate population of 1,500.
