= Wojciechowo, Gmina Rzgów =

Wojciechowo
- Village
- Location within Poland
- Coordinates: 52°05′33″N 18°02′58″E
- Country: Poland
- Voivodeship: Greater Poland
- County: Konin
- Gmina: Rzgów

Wojciechowo (Polish pronunciation: [vɔjt͡ɕɛˈxɔvɔ]) is a village in the administrative district of Gmina Rzgów, within Konin County, Greater Poland Voivodeship, in west-central Poland.
