= Bobrowo, Gmina Rzgów =

Bobrowo
- Village
- Location within Poland
- Coordinates: 52°5′19″N 18°3′58″E
- Country: Poland
- Voivodeship: Greater Poland
- County: Konin
- Gmina: Rzgów

Bobrowo [bɔˈbrɔvɔ] is a village in the administrative district of Gmina Rzgów, within Konin County, Greater Poland Voivodeship, in west-central Poland.
