= Wycinki, Greater Poland Voivodeship =

Wycinki
- Village
- Location within Poland
- Coordinates: 52°4′49″N 18°2′41″E
- Country: Poland
- Voivodeship: Greater Poland
- County: Konin
- Gmina: Grodziec
- Population: 30

Wycinki [vɨˈt͡ɕinki] is a village in the administrative district of Gmina Grodziec, within Konin County, Greater Poland Voivodeship, in west-central Poland.
