= Gmina Rzgów, Greater Poland Voivodeship =

Gmina Rzgów Rzgów Commune
- Gmina
- Flag Coat of arms

- Coordinates (Rzgów Pierwszy): 52°9′N 18°3′E
- Country: Poland
- Voivodeship: Greater Poland
- County: Konin County
- Seat: Rzgów Pierwszy

Area
  - Total: 104.68 km^{2} (40.42 sq mi)

Population (2006)
  - Total: 6,818
  - Density: 65.13/km^{2} (168.7/sq mi)
- Website: http://www.gminarzgow.pl

Gmina Rzgów is a rural gmina (administrative district) in Konin County, Greater Poland Voivodeship, in west-central Poland. Its seat is the village of Rzgów Pierwszy, which lies approximately 17 kilometres (11 mi) south-west of Konin and 83 km (52 mi) east of the regional capital Poznań.

The gmina covers an area of 104.68 square kilometres (40.4 sq mi), and as of 2006 its total population is 6,818.

The gmina contains part of the protected area called Warta Landscape Park.

== Villages ==
Gmina Rzgów contains the villages and settlements of Babia, Barłogi, Błonice, Bobrowo, Bożatki, Branno, Dąbrowica, Goździków, Grabienice, Józefowo, Kowalewek, Kurów, Mądroszki, Modła, Osiecza Druga, Osiecza Pierwsza, Rzgów Drugi, Rzgów Pierwszy, Sławsk, Świątniki, Witnica, Wojciechowo, Zarzew, Zarzewek and Zastruże.

== Neighbouring gminas ==
Gmina Rzgów is bordered by the gminas of Golina, Grodziec, Lądek, Rychwał, Stare Miasto and Zagórów.
