= Rychwał =

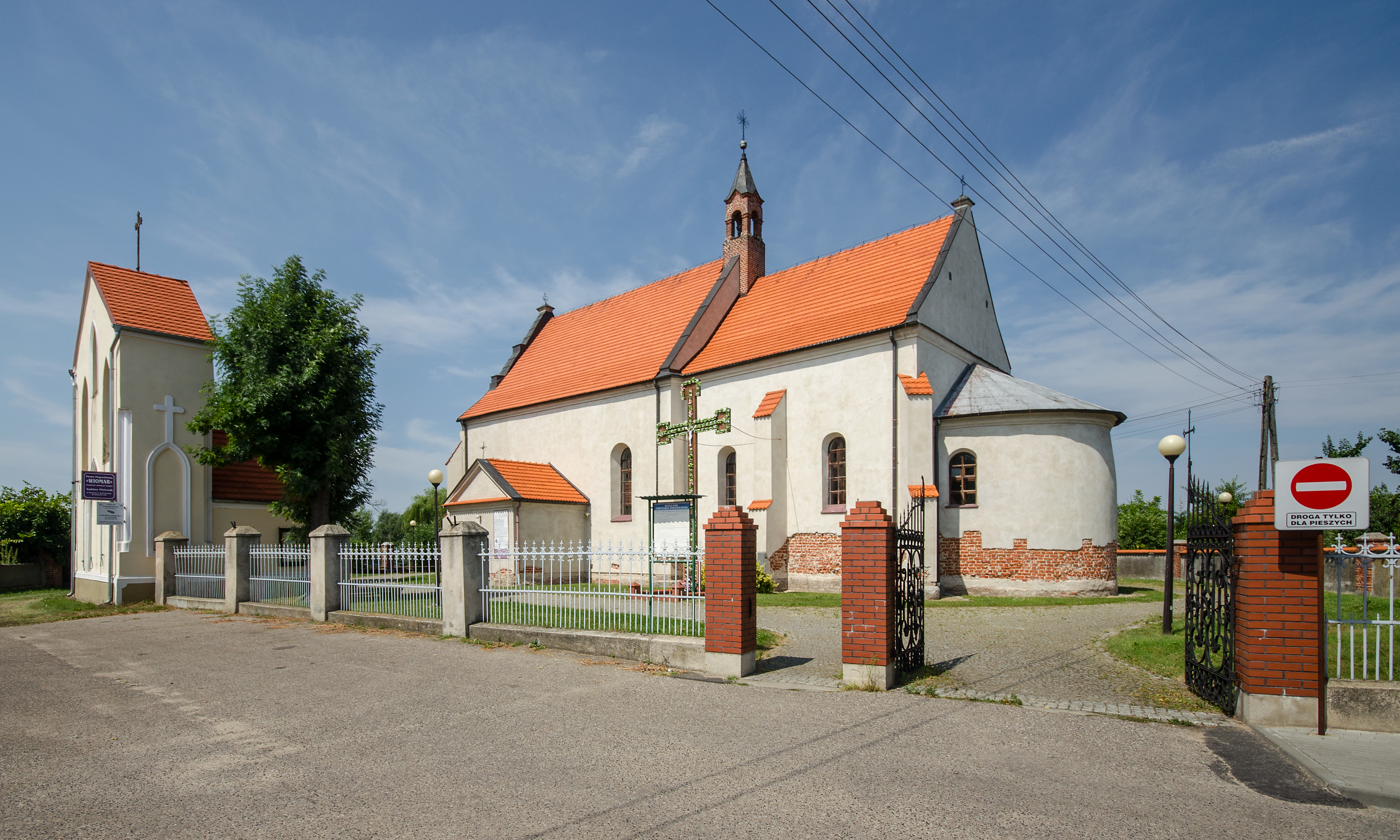
- Church of Holy Trinity

- Coat of arms

- Location within Poland
- Coordinates: 52°4′16″N 18°10′18″E
- Country: Poland
- Voivodeship: Greater Poland
- County: Konin
- Gmina: Rychwał
- Established: 14th century
- Town rights: 1394-1870, 1921

Government
  - Mayor: Stefan Dziamara

Area
  - Total: 9.69 km^{2} (3.74 sq mi)

Population (2010)
  - Total: 2,364
  - Density: 244/km^{2} (632/sq mi)
- Time zone: UTC+1 (CET)
  - Summer (DST): UTC+2 (CEST)
- Postal code: 62-570
- Area code: +48 63
- Car plates: PKN
- Website: http://www.rychwal.pl/

Rychwał [ˈrɨxfau̯] is a town in central Poland, with 2,364 inhabitants (2010) in Konin County, Greater Poland Voivodship.

== History ==
The town was founded either in the late 14th or the early 15th century. It was a private town of the Złotkowski and Dobrzycki noble families, administratively located in the Konin County in the Kalisz Voivodeship in the Greater Poland Province of the Kingdom of Poland. 102 Jews lived in the town as of 1765. Six annual fairs were held in the town in the late 19th century.

== Demographics ==
Historical population

Year	Pop.	±%
1890	1,210	—
1910	1,563	+29.2%
1921	1,891	+21.0%
1931	2,011	+6.3%

Year	Pop.	±%
1939	2,636	+31.1%
1950	1,236	−53.1%
1960	1,422	+15.0%
2010	2,364	+66.2%

== Transport ==
National road 25 bypasses Rychwał to the west. National road 25 connects it to Konin to the north and to Kalisz to the south.

Voivodeship road 443 passes right through the town.

The nearest railway station is in Konin.
