= Borki, Konin County =

Borki
- Village
- Location within Poland
- Coordinates: 52°13′58″N 18°29′03″E
- Country: Poland
- Voivodeship: Greater Poland
- County: Konin
- Gmina: Kramsk

Borki [ˈbɔrki] is a village in the administrative district of Gmina Kramsk, within Konin County, Greater Poland Voivodeship, in west-central Poland.
