= Barce, Greater Poland Voivodeship =

Barce
- Village
- Location within Poland
- Coordinates: 52°13′56″N 18°27′55″E
- Country: Poland
- Voivodeship: Greater Poland
- County: Konin
- Gmina: Kramsk
- Population: 110

Barce [ˈbart͡sɛ] is a village in the administrative district of Gmina Kramsk, within Konin County, Greater Poland Voivodeship, in west-central Poland.
