= Gmina Grodziec =

Gmina Grodziec Grodziec Commune
- Gmina
- Coat of arms

- Coordinates (Grodziec): 52°2′N 18°4′E
- Country: Poland
- Voivodeship: Greater Poland
- County: Konin County
- Seat: Grodziec

Area
  - Total: 117.72 km^{2} (45.45 sq mi)

Population (2006)
  - Total: 5,233
  - Density: 44.45/km^{2} (115.1/sq mi)
- Website: http://www.grodziec.pl/

Gmina Grodziec is a rural gmina (administrative district) in Konin County, Greater Poland Voivodeship, in west-central Poland. Its seat is the village of Grodziec, which lies approximately 25 kilometres (16 mi) south-west of Konin and 89 km (55 mi) south-east of the regional capital Poznań.

The gmina covers an area of 117.72 square kilometres (45.5 sq mi), and as of 2006 its total population is 5,233.

== Villages ==
Gmina Grodziec contains the villages and settlements of Aleksandrówek, Biała, Biała-Kolonia, Biskupice, Biskupice-Kolonia, Bystrzyca, Czarnybród, Grodziec, Janów, Junno, Konary, Królików, Królików Czwarty, Lądek, Łagiewniki, Lipice, Mokre, Nowa Ciświca, Nowa Huta, Nowe Grądy, Nowy Borowiec, Stara Ciświca, Stara Huta, Stare Grądy, Stary Borowiec, Stary Tartak, Tartak, Wielołęka, Wycinki and Zaguźnica.

== Neighbouring gminas ==
Gmina Grodziec is bordered by the gminas of Blizanów, Chocz, Gizałki, Rychwał, Rzgów, Stawiszyn and Zagórów.
