= Krzymów, Greater Poland Voivodeship =

Krzymów
- Village
- Location within Poland
- Coordinates: 52°12′N 18°26′E
- Country: Poland
- Voivodeship: Greater Poland
- County: Konin
- Gmina: Krzymów
- Population: 524
- Website: http://krzymow.nowoczesnagmina.pl

Krzymów [ˈkʂɨmuf] is a village in Konin County, Greater Poland Voivodeship, in west-central Poland. It is the seat of the gmina (administrative district) called Gmina Krzymów.
