= Gmina Rychwał =

Gmina Rychwał Rychwał Commune
- Gmina
- Coat of arms

- Coordinates (Rychwał): 52°4′16″N 18°10′18″E
- Country: Poland
- Voivodeship: Greater Poland
- County: Konin County
- Seat: Rychwał

Area
  - Total: 117.82 km^{2} (45.49 sq mi)

Population (2006)
  - Total: 8,387
  - Density: 71.18/km^{2} (184.4/sq mi)
  - Urban: 2,377
  - Rural: 6,010
- Website: https://www.rychwal.pl/

Gmina Rychwał is an urban-rural gmina (administrative district) in Konin County, Greater Poland Voivodeship, in west-central Poland. Its seat is the town of Rychwał, which lies approximately 18 kilometres (11 mi) south of Konin and 94 km (58 mi) south-east of the regional capital Poznań.

The gmina covers an area of 117.82 square kilometres (45.5 sq mi), and as of 2006 its total population is 8,387 (out of which the population of Rychwał amounts to 2,377, and the population of the rural part of the gmina is 6,010).

== Villages ==
Apart from the town of Rychwał, Gmina Rychwał contains the villages and settlements of Biała Panieńska, Broniki, Czyżew, Dąbroszyn, Franki, Gliny, Grabowa, Grochowy, Jaroszewice Grodzieckie, Jaroszewice Rychwalskie, Kuchary Borowe, Kuchary Kościelne, Lubiny, Modlibogowice, Rozalin, Rybie, Siąszyce, Siąszyce Trzecie, Święcia, Wardężyn, Wola Rychwalska, Złotkowy and Zosinki.

== Neighbouring gminas ==
Gmina Rychwał is bordered by the gminas of Grodziec, Mycielin, Rzgów, Stare Miasto, Stawiszyn and Tuliszków.
