= Gmina Golina =

Gmina Golina Golina Commune
- Gmina
- Flag Coat of arms

- Coordinates (Golina): 52°15′48″N 18°6′43″E
- Country: Poland
- Voivodeship: Greater Poland
- County: Konin County
- Seat: Golina

Area
  - Total: 99.05 km^{2} (38.24 sq mi)

Population (2006)
  - Total: 11,326
  - Density: 114.3/km^{2} (296.2/sq mi)
  - Urban: 4,330
  - Rural: 6,996
- Website: http://www.golina.pl/index1.html

Gmina Golina is an urban-rural gmina (administrative district) in Konin County, Greater Poland Voivodeship, in west-central Poland. Its seat is the town of Golina, which lies approximately 12 kilometres (7 mi) north-west of Konin and 83 km (52 mi) east of the regional capital Poznań.

The gmina covers an area of 99.05 square kilometres (38.2 sq mi), and as of 2006 its total population is 11,326 (out of which the population of Golina amounts to 4,330, and the population of the rural part of the gmina is 6,996).

== Villages ==
Apart from the town of Golina, Gmina Golina contains the villages and settlements of Adamów, Barbarka, Bobrowo, Brzeźniak, Chrusty, Głodowo, Golina-Kolonia, Kawnice, Kolno, Kraśnica, Lubiecz, Myśliborskie Holendry, Myślibórz, Przyjma, Radolina, Rosocha, Sługocinek, Spławie and Węglew.

== Neighbouring gminas ==
Gmina Golina is bordered by the city of Konin and by the gminas of Kazimierz Biskupi, Lądek, Rzgów, Słupca and Stare Miasto.
