= Witnica, Greater Poland Voivodeship =

Witnica
- Village
- Location within Poland
- Coordinates: 52°7′N 18°4′E
- Country: Poland
- Voivodeship: Greater Poland
- County: Konin
- Gmina: Rzgów

Witnica [vitˈnit͡sa] is a village in the administrative district of Gmina Rzgów, within Konin County, Greater Poland Voivodeship, in west-central Poland.
