= Podgór, Poland =

Podgór
- Village
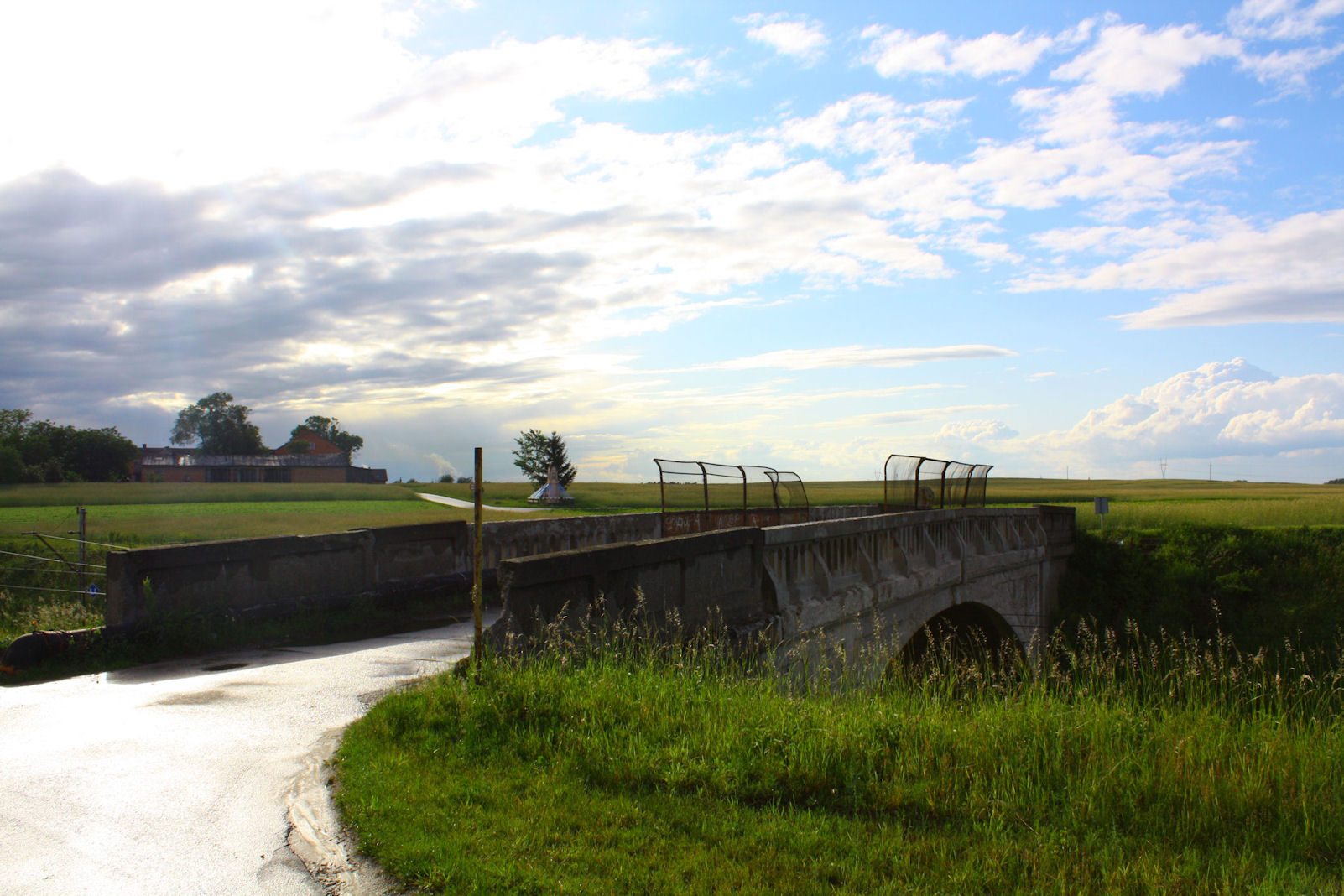

- Location within Poland
- Coordinates: 52°15′13″N 18°25′37″E
- Country: Poland
- Voivodeship: Greater Poland
- County: Konin
- Gmina: Kramsk

Podgór [ˈpɔdɡur] is a village in the administrative district of Gmina Kramsk, within Konin County, Greater Poland Voivodeship, in west-central Poland.
