= Bobrovo (settlement, Primorsky District, Arkhangelsk Oblast) =

Bobrovo Боброво
- Settlement
- Location within Arkhangelsk Oblast Location within Russia
- Coordinates: 64°21′N 41°19′E
- Country: Russia
- Region: Arkhangelsk Oblast
- District: Primorsky District
- Time zone: UTC+3:00

Bobrovo (Russian: Боброво) is a rural locality (a settlement) and the administrative center of Bobrovo-Lyavlenskoye Rural Settlement of Primorsky District, Arkhangelsk Oblast, Russia. The population was 1,139 as of 2010. There are 22 streets.

== Geography ==
Bobrovo is located 41 km southeast of Arkhangelsk (the district's administrative centre) by road. Bobrovo (village) is the nearest rural locality.
