= Bobrovo (village, Primorsky District, Arkhangelsk Oblast) =

Bobrovo Боброво
- Village
- Location within Arkhangelsk Oblast Location within Russia
- Coordinates: 64°21′N 41°11′E
- Country: Russia
- Region: Arkhangelsk Oblast
- District: Primorsky District
- Time zone: UTC+3:00

Bobrovo (Russian: Боброво) is a rural locality (a village) in Koskogorskoye Rural Settlement of Primorsky District, Arkhangelsk Oblast, Russia. The population was 29 as of 2010. There are 3 streets.

== Geography ==
Bobrovo is located 43 km southeast of Arkhangelsk (the district's administrative centre) by road. Bobrovo (settlement) is the nearest rural locality.
