= Zumin =

Zumin زومين
- Village
- Location within Iran
- Coordinates: 28°50′39″N 58°02′44″E
- Country: Iran
- Province: Kerman
- County: Bam
- Bakhsh: Central
- Rural District: Howmeh

Population (2006)
  - Total: 18
- Time zone: UTC+3:30 (IRST)
  - Summer (DST): UTC+4:30 (IRDT)

Zumin (Persian: زومين, also Romanized as Zūmīn; also known as Rūmīn and Zoobin) is a village in Howmeh Rural District, in the Central District of Bam County, Kerman Province, Iran. At the 2006 census, its population was 18, in 5 families.
