= Grodziec, Greater Poland Voivodeship =

Grodziec
- Village
- Location within Poland
- Coordinates: 52°2′N 18°4′E
- Country: Poland
- Voivodeship: Greater Poland
- County: Konin
- Gmina: Grodziec
- Population: 1,400

Grodziec [ˈɡrɔd͡ʑɛt͡s] is a village in Konin County, Greater Poland Voivodeship, in west-central Poland. It is the seat of the gmina (administrative district) called Gmina Grodziec.
