= Konin County =

Konin County Powiat koniński
- County
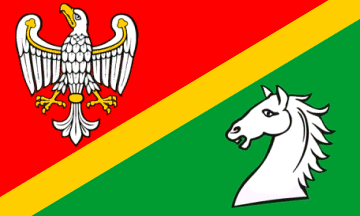
- Flag Coat of arms

- Location within the voivodeship
- Coordinates (Konin): 52°13′N 18°16′E
- Country: Poland
- Voivodeship: Greater Poland
- Seat: Konin
- Gminas: Total 14: Gmina Golina; Gmina Grodziec; Gmina Kazimierz Biskupi; Gmina Kleczew; Gmina Kramsk; Gmina Krzymów; Gmina Rychwał; Gmina Rzgów; Gmina Skulsk; Gmina Ślesin; Gmina Sompolno; Gmina Stare Miasto; Gmina Wierzbinek; Gmina Wilczyn

Area
  - Total: 1,578.71 km^{2} (609.54 sq mi)

Population (2006)
  - Total: 123,646
  - Density: 78.3209/km^{2} (202.850/sq mi)
  - Urban: 17,677
  - Rural: 105,969
- Car plates: PKN
- Website: www.powiat.konin.pl

Konin County (Polish: powiat koniński) is a unit of territorial administration and local government (powiat) in Greater Poland Voivodeship, west-central Poland. It came into being on January 1, 1999, as a result of the Polish local government reforms passed in 1998. Its administrative seat is the city of Konin, although the city is not part of the county (it constitutes a separate city county). The county contains five towns: Golina, 12 km (7 mi) north-west of Konin, Kleczew, 19 km (12 mi) north of Konin, Sompolno, 27 km (17 mi) north-east of Konin, Ślesin, 17 km (11 mi) north of Konin, and Rychwał, 18 km (11 mi) south of Konin.

The county covers an area of 1,578.71 square kilometres (609.5 sq mi). As of 2006, its total population is 123,646, out of which the population of Golina is 4,330, that of Kleczew is 4,173, that of Sompolno is 3,695, that of Ślesin is 3,102, that of Rychwał is 2,377, and the rural population is 105,969.

== Neighbouring counties ==
Apart from the city of Konin, Konin County is also bordered by Mogilno County, Inowrocław County and Radziejów County to the north, Koło County to the east, Turek County to the south-east, Kalisz County to the south, Pleszew County to the south-west, and Słupca County to the west.

== Administrative divisions ==
The county is subdivided into 14 gminas (five urban-rural and nine rural). These are listed in the following table, in descending order of population.

Gmina	Type	Area (km^{2})	Population (2006)	Seat
Gmina Ślesin	urban-rural	145.7	13,446	Ślesin
Gmina Golina	urban-rural	99.1	11,326	Golina
Gmina Sompolno	urban-rural	137.4	10,530	Sompolno
Gmina Kazimierz Biskupi	rural	108.0	10,459	Kazimierz Biskupi
Gmina Stare Miasto	rural	97.8	10,355	Stare Miasto
Gmina Kramsk	rural	131.8	10,133	Kramsk
Gmina Kleczew	urban-rural	110.1	9,721	Kleczew
Gmina Rychwał	urban-rural	117.8	8,387	Rychwał
Gmina Wierzbinek	rural	148.1	7,597	Wierzbinek
Gmina Krzymów	rural	92.7	7,074	Krzymów
Gmina Rzgów	rural	104.7	6,818	Rzgów Pierwszy
Gmina Wilczyn	rural	83.1	6,422	Wilczyn
Gmina Skulsk	rural	84.9	6,145	Skulsk
Gmina Grodziec	rural	117.7	5,233	Grodziec
