= Sarnowa =

Sarnowa is a Polish place name of:

- Sarnowa, Rawicz, a historic once independent town, now a neighbourhood in Rawicz
- Sarnowa, Konin County, a village in the administrative district of Gmina Ślesin, Konin County
- Sarnowa-Kolonia, a village in the administrative district of Gmina Ślesin
- Sarnowa Góra, a village in the administrative district of Gmina Sońsk, Ciechanów County

== See also ==
- Sarnówka (disambiguation)
