= Smardzewo =

Smardzewo may refer to the following places:

- Smardzewo, Lubusz Voivodeship (west Poland)
- Smardzewo, Płock County in Masovian Voivodeship (east-central Poland)
- Smardzewo, Płońsk County in Masovian Voivodeship (east-central Poland)
- Smardzewo, West Pomeranian Voivodeship (north-west Poland)
