= Biele =

Biele may refer to:

== Places ==
- Biele, Kuyavian-Pomeranian Voivodeship (north-central Poland)
- Biele, Masovian Voivodeship (east-central Poland)
- Biele, Podlaskie Voivodeship (north-east Poland)
- Biele, Gmina Sompolno in Greater Poland Voivodeship (west-central Poland)
- Biele, Gmina Ślesin in Greater Poland Voivodeship (west-central Poland)

== People ==
- David Biele (fl. 2019 – present), an American local politician from Massachusetts
