= Tokary =

Tokary may refer to the following places in Poland:

- Tokary, Lower Silesian Voivodeship (south-west Poland)
- Tokary, Lublin Voivodeship (east Poland)
- Tokary, Podlaskie Voivodeship (north-east Poland)
- Tokary, Masovian Voivodeship (east-central Poland)
- Tokary, Greater Poland Voivodeship (west-central Poland)
- Tokary, Opole Voivodeship (south-west Poland)
- Tokary, Pomeranian Voivodeship (north Poland)
- Tokary, West Pomeranian Voivodeship (north-west Poland)

== See also ==
- Tokary-Gajówka, Masovian Voivodeship (east-central Poland)
