= Idzikowice =

Idzikowice may refer to the following places:

- Idzikowice, Opoczno County in Łódź Voivodeship (central Poland)
- Idzikowice, Poddębice County in Łódź Voivodeship (central Poland)
- Idzikowice, Masovian Voivodeship (east-central Poland)
- Idzikowice, Opole Voivodeship (south-west Poland)
