= Kepa =

Kepa may refer to:

== People ==
=== Albania ===
- Ilir Kepa (born 1966), Albanian football striker

=== Fiji ===
- Sailosi Kepa, Fijian statesman, judge, and diplomat
- Teimumu Kepa, Fijian politician

=== New Zealand ===
- Kepa Hamuera Anaha Ehau, New Zealand tribal leader
- Anaha Kepa Te Rahui, Maori tribal leader
- Henare Kepa Te Ahururu (fl. 1868), awardee of the New Zealand Cross

=== Spain ===
- Kepa Arrizabalaga (born 1994), Spanish footballer
- Kepa Blanco (born 1984), Spanish footballer
- Kepa Junkera (born 1965), Spanish musician

== Places ==
- Kepa or Mittagskogel, a mountain on the Austro-Slovenian border
- Kępa (disambiguation), Polish placename
- Kepa Bush Reserve, a reserve in New Zealand

== Other uses ==
- KEPA, former service for Finnish nongovernmental organizations
- Kepa fistulosa, alternate name for Allium fistulosum, species of scallion

== See also ==
- Kippah, Jewish skullcap
- Duri Kepa, administrative village in DKI Jakarta, Indonesia
