= Roznowa =

Roznowa may refer to the following places in Poland:

- Rożnowa, Lesser Poland Voivodeship (south Poland)
- Różnowa, Greater Poland Voivodeship (west-central Poland)
