= Żółwiniec =

Żółwiniec may refer to the following places:

- Żółwiniec, Gmina Ślesin in Greater Poland Voivodeship (west-central Poland)
- Żółwiniec, Gmina Wierzbinek in Greater Poland Voivodeship (west-central Poland)
- Żółwiniec, Kuyavian-Pomeranian Voivodeship (north-central Poland)
- Żółwiniec, Warmian-Masurian Voivodeship (north Poland)
