= Koschmin =

Koschmin can refer to

- Kreis Koschmin, an administrative district of Prussia
- Koschmin, now Koźmin, Szamotuły County, a former village of Prussia now in Poland
- Koschmin, now Koźminek, Lubusz Voivodeship, also a former village of Prussia now in Poland
- Koschmin, now Koźmin Wielkopolski in Poland; former seat of Kreis Koschmin
