= Konstantynów =

Konstantynów may refer to the following locations in Poland:

- Konstantynów Łódzki, a town near Łódź in central Poland
- Konstantynów, a district of Lublin
- Konstantynów, Lublin Voivodeship (east Poland)
- Konstantynów, Kutno County in Łódź Voivodeship (central Poland)
- Konstantynów, Łowicz County in Łódź Voivodeship (central Poland)
- Konstantynów, Opoczno County in Łódź Voivodeship (central Poland)
- Konstantynów, Pajęczno County in Łódź Voivodeship (central Poland)
- Konstantynów, Rawa County in Łódź Voivodeship (central Poland)
- Konstantynów, Płock County in Masovian Voivodeship (east-central Poland)
- Konstantynów, Sochaczew County in Masovian Voivodeship (east-central Poland)
- Konstantynów, Greater Poland Voivodeship (west-central Poland)
- Konstantynów, Silesian Voivodeship (south Poland)

== See also ==
- Konstantynowo (disambiguation)
