= Baltrusch =

Baltrusch is a surname. Notable people with the name include:

- Frank Baltrusch (born 1964), German backstroke swimmer
- Friedrich Baltrusch (1876–1949), German military officer and politician
