= Wąsosze =

Wąsosze may refer to the following places:

- Wąsosze, Greater Poland Voivodeship (west-central Poland)
- Wąsosze, Mława County in Masovian Voivodeship (east-central Poland)
- Wąsosze, Węgrów County in Masovian Voivodeship (east-central Poland)
- Wąsosze (lake), lake in West Pomeranian Voivodeship (northwestern Poland)
