= Pogorzele =

Pogorzele may refer to the following places:

- Pogorzele, Greater Poland Voivodeship (west-central Poland)
- Pogorzele, Lębork County in Pomeranian Voivodeship (north Poland)
- Pogorzele, Sztum County in Pomeranian Voivodeship (north Poland)
