= Kijowiec-Ściany =

- Village
- Location within Poland
- Coordinates: 52°24′40″N 18°17′57″E
- Country: Poland
- Voivodeship: Greater Poland
- County: Konin
- Gmina: Ślesin
- Population: 36

Kijowiec-Ściany [kiˈjɔvjɛt͡s ˈɕt͡ɕanɨ] is a village in the administrative district of Gmina Ślesin, within Konin County, Greater Poland Voivodeship, in west-central Poland.
