= Goraninek =

- Village
- Location within Poland
- Coordinates: 52°21′22″N 18°15′27″E
- Country: Poland
- Voivodeship: Greater Poland
- County: Konin
- Gmina: Ślesin
- Population: 50

Goraninek [ɡɔraˈninɛk] is a village in the administrative district of Gmina Ślesin, within Konin County, Greater Poland Voivodeship, in west-central Poland.

The postal code of Goraninek is 62-250.
