= Florentynowo =

- Village
- Location within Poland
- Coordinates: 52°22′7″N 18°15′25″E
- Country: Poland
- Voivodeship: Greater Poland
- County: Konin
- Gmina: Ślesin
- Population: 35

Florentynowo [flɔrɛntɨˈnɔvɔ] is a village in the administrative district of Gmina Ślesin, within Konin County, Greater Poland Voivodeship, in west-central Poland.
