= Wilenko =

- Village
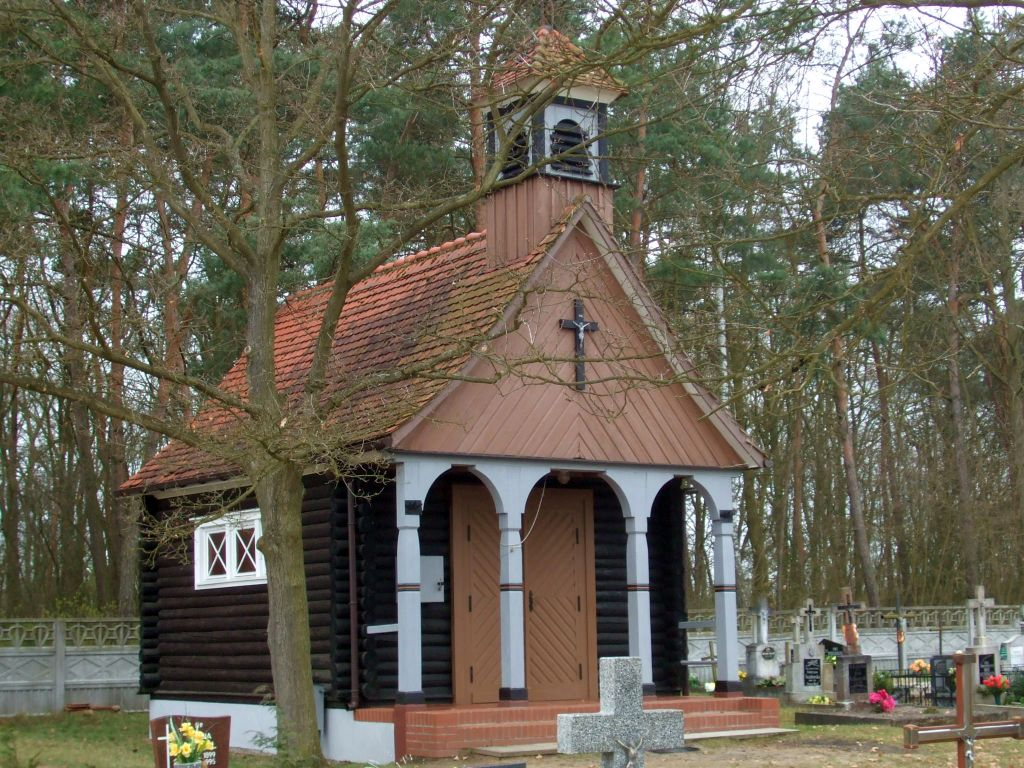

- Location within Poland
- Coordinates: 52°17′38″N 15°40′29″E
- Country: Poland
- Voivodeship: Lubusz
- County: Świebodzin
- Gmina: Szczaniec
- Population: 119

Wilenko [viˈlɛnkɔ] is a village in the administrative district of Gmina Szczaniec, within Świebodzin County, Lubusz Voivodeship, in western Poland.
