= Nowe Karcze =

- Settlement
- Location within Poland
- Coordinates: 52°18′34″N 15°38′35″E
- Country: Poland
- Voivodeship: Lubusz
- County: Świebodzin
- Gmina: Szczaniec
- Population: 50

Nowe Karcze [ˈnɔvɛ ˈkart͡ʂɛ] is a settlement in the administrative district of Gmina Szczaniec, within Świebodzin County, Lubusz Voivodeship, in western Poland.
