= Szyszyn-Helenowo =

- Settlement
- Location within Poland
- Coordinates: 52°23′30″N 18°16′49″E
- Country: Poland
- Voivodeship: Greater Poland
- County: Konin
- Gmina: Ślesin
- Population: 94

Szyszyn-Helenowo [ˈʂɨʂɨn xɛlɛˈnɔvɔ] is a settlement in the administrative district of Gmina Ślesin, within Konin County, Greater Poland Voivodeship, in west-central Poland.
