= Holendry Wąsowskie =

- Village
- Location within Poland
- Coordinates: 52°20′45″N 18°18′47″E
- Country: Poland
- Voivodeship: Greater Poland
- County: Konin
- Gmina: Ślesin
- Population: 54

Holendry Wąsowskie [xɔˈlɛndrɨ vɔ̃ˈsɔfskʲɛ] is a village in the administrative district of Gmina Ślesin, within Konin County, Greater Poland Voivodeship, in west-central Poland.
