= Bylew =

- Village
- Location within Poland
- Coordinates: 52°20′17″N 18°24′38″E
- Country: Poland
- Voivodeship: Greater Poland
- County: Konin
- Gmina: Ślesin

Bylew [ˈbɨlɛf] is a village in the administrative district of Gmina Ślesin, within Konin County, Greater Poland Voivodeship, in west-central Poland.
