= Pogoń Lubstowska =

- Village
- Location within Poland
- Coordinates: 52°21′25″N 18°24′44″E
- Country: Poland
- Voivodeship: Greater Poland
- County: Konin
- Gmina: Ślesin
- Population: 43

Pogoń Lubstowska (Polish pronunciation: [ˈpɔɡɔj̃ lupsˈtɔfska]) is a village in the administrative district of Gmina Ślesin, within Konin County, Greater Poland Voivodeship, in west-central Poland.
