= Marianowo, Gmina Ślesin =

Marianowo
- Village
- Location within Poland
- Coordinates: 52°25′33″N 18°16′01″E
- Country: Poland
- Voivodeship: Greater Poland
- County: Konin
- Gmina: Ślesin

Marianowo [marjaˈnɔvɔ] is a village in the administrative district of Gmina Ślesin, within Konin County, Greater Poland Voivodeship, in west-central Poland.
