= Bylew-Parcele =

- Village
- Location within Poland
- Coordinates: 52°19′59.91″N 18°23′51.79″E
- Country: Poland
- Voivodeship: Greater Poland
- County: Konin
- Gmina: Ślesin
- Population: 88

Bylew-Parcele [ˈbɨlɛf parˈt͡sɛlɛ] is a village in the administrative district of Gmina Ślesin, within Konin County, Greater Poland Voivodeship, in west-central Poland.
