= Pogoń-Leśniczówka =

- Settlement
- Location within Poland
- Coordinates: 52°21′15″N 18°23′33″E
- Country: Poland
- Voivodeship: Greater Poland
- County: Konin
- Gmina: Ślesin
- Population: 3

Pogoń-Leśniczówka (Polish pronunciation: [ˈpɔɡɔj̃ lɛɕɲiˈtʂufka]) is a settlement in the administrative district of Gmina Ślesin, within Konin County, Greater Poland Voivodeship, in west-central Poland.
