= Różopole, Konin County =

Różopole
- Village
- Location within Poland
- Coordinates: 52°22′04″N 18°19′18″E
- Country: Poland
- Voivodeship: Greater Poland
- County: Konin
- Gmina: Ślesin
- Population: 196

Różopole [ruʐɔˈpɔlɛ] is a village in the administrative district of Gmina Ślesin, within Konin County, Greater Poland Voivodeship, in west-central Poland.
