= Kolebki-Ługi =

- Settlement
- Location within Poland
- Coordinates: 52°21′23″N 18°22′10″E
- Country: Poland
- Voivodeship: Greater Poland
- County: Konin
- Gmina: Ślesin
- Population: 10

Kolebki-Ługi [kɔˈlɛpki ˈwuɡi] is a settlement in the administrative district of Gmina Ślesin, within Konin County, Greater Poland Voivodeship, in west-central Poland.
