= Szczaniec =

- Village
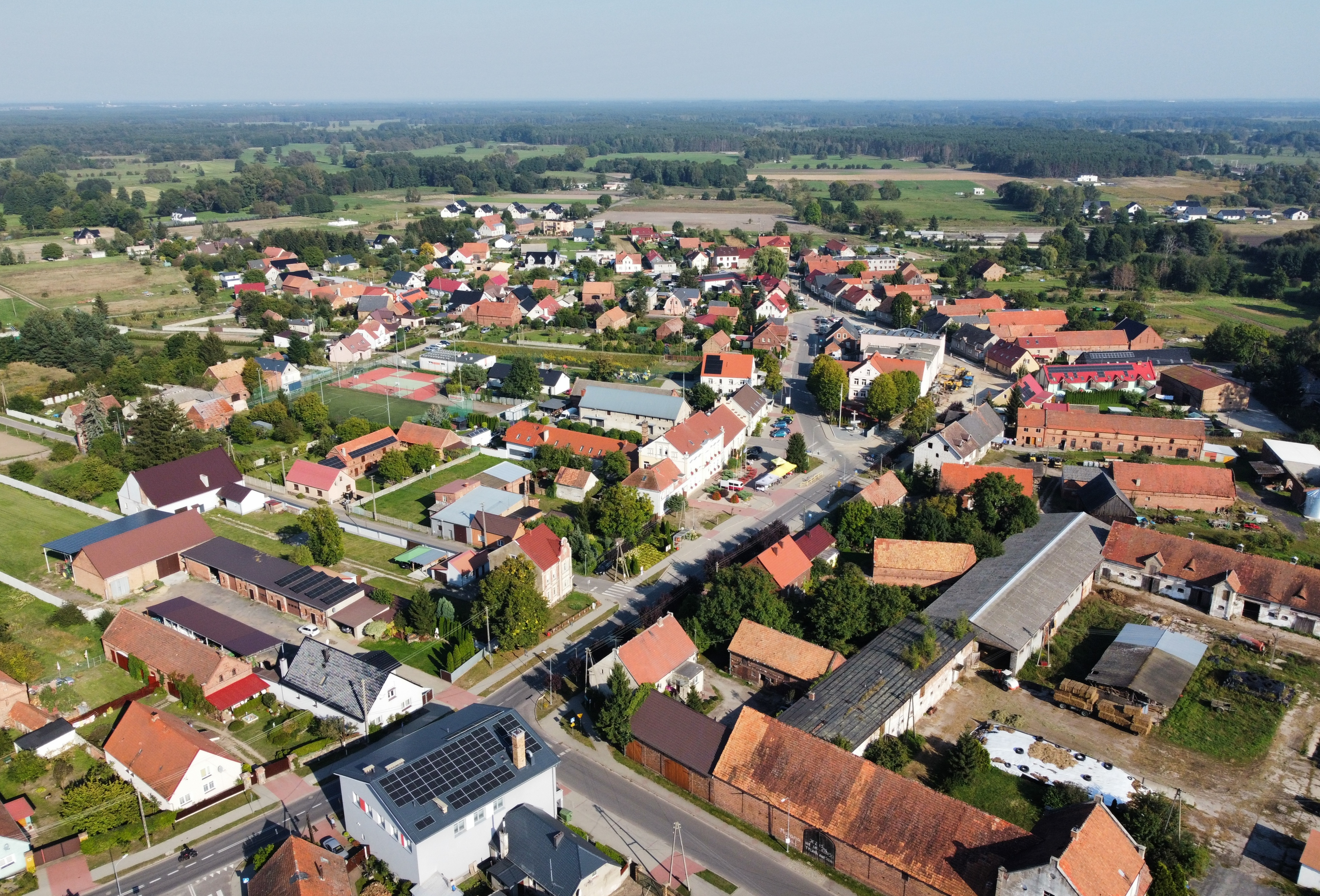
- Aerial view of Szczaniec

- Location within Poland
- Coordinates: 52°16′N 15°41′E
- Country: Poland
- Voivodeship: Lubusz
- County: Świebodzin
- Gmina: Szczaniec

Population
  - Total: 1,473
- Time zone: UTC+1 (CET)
  - Summer (DST): UTC+2 (CEST)
- Vehicle registration: FSW
- Website: http://www.szczaniec.pl

Szczaniec ([ˈʂt͡ʂaɲɛt͡s]; German: Stentsch) is a village in Świebodzin County, Lubusz Voivodeship, in western Poland. It is the seat of the gmina (administrative district) called Gmina Szczaniec.

During World War II, in 1940–1941, Nazi Germany operated a forced labour camp for Jewish men in the village.
