= Mikorzyn, Konin County =

Mikorzyn
- Village
- Location within Poland
- Coordinates: 52°21′N 18°18′E
- Country: Poland
- Voivodeship: Greater Poland
- County: Konin
- Gmina: Ślesin
- Population (approx.): 550

Mikorzyn [miˈkɔʐɨn] is a village in the administrative district of Gmina Ślesin, within Konin County, Greater Poland Voivodeship, in west-central Poland.

The village has an approximate population of 550.
