= Myszęcin =

- Village
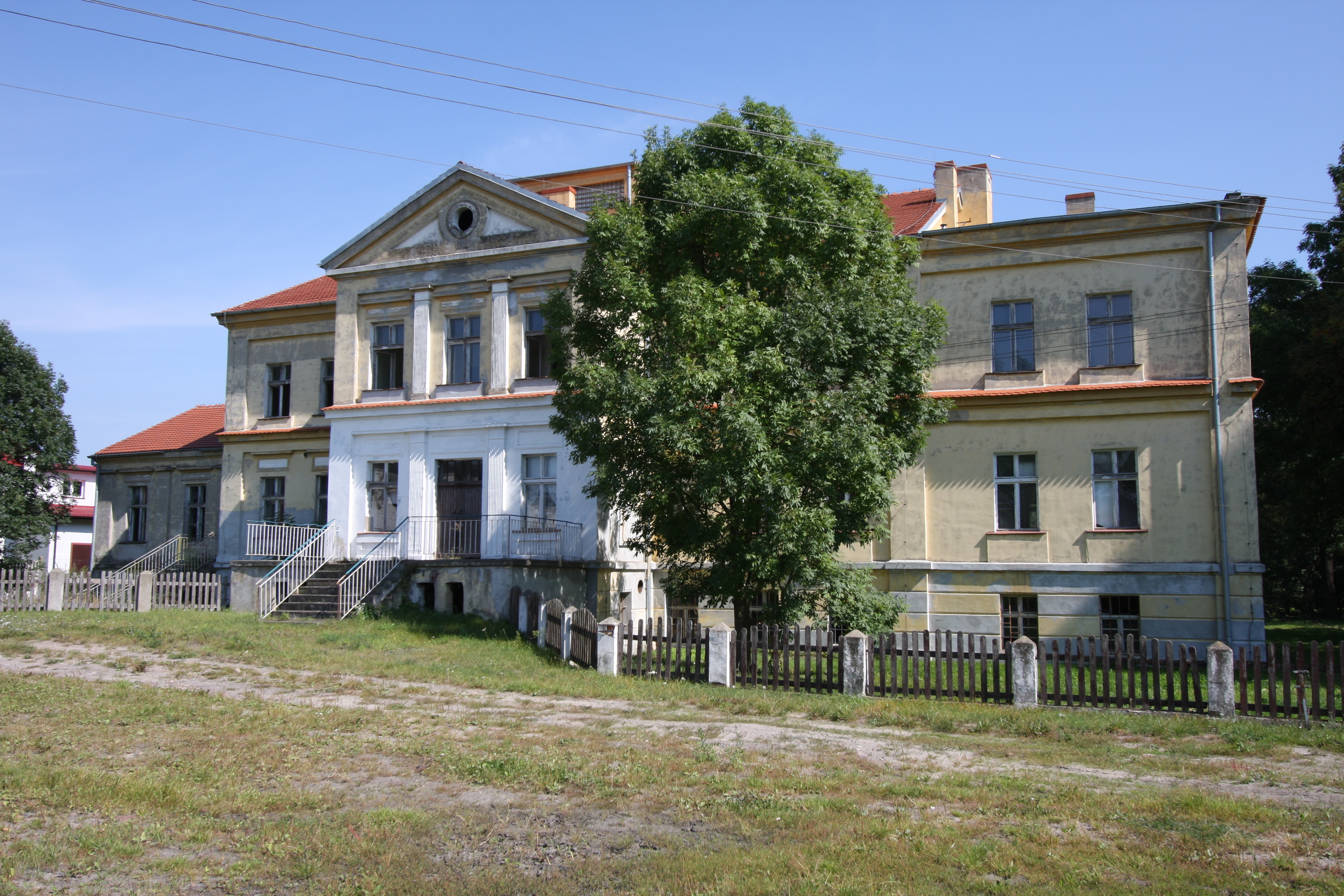
- Old manor house in Myszęcin

- Location within Poland
- Coordinates: 52°17′N 15°38′E
- Country: Poland
- Voivodeship: Lubusz
- County: Świebodzin
- Gmina: Szczaniec

Population
  - Total: 632
- Time zone: UTC+1 (CET)
  - Summer (DST): UTC+2 (CEST)
- Vehicle registration: FSW

Myszęcin [mɨˈʂɛnt͡ɕin] is a village in the administrative district of Gmina Szczaniec, within Świebodzin County, Lubusz Voivodeship, in western Poland.

Two Polish citizens were murdered by Nazi Germany in the village during World War II.
