= Wolimirzyce =

- Village
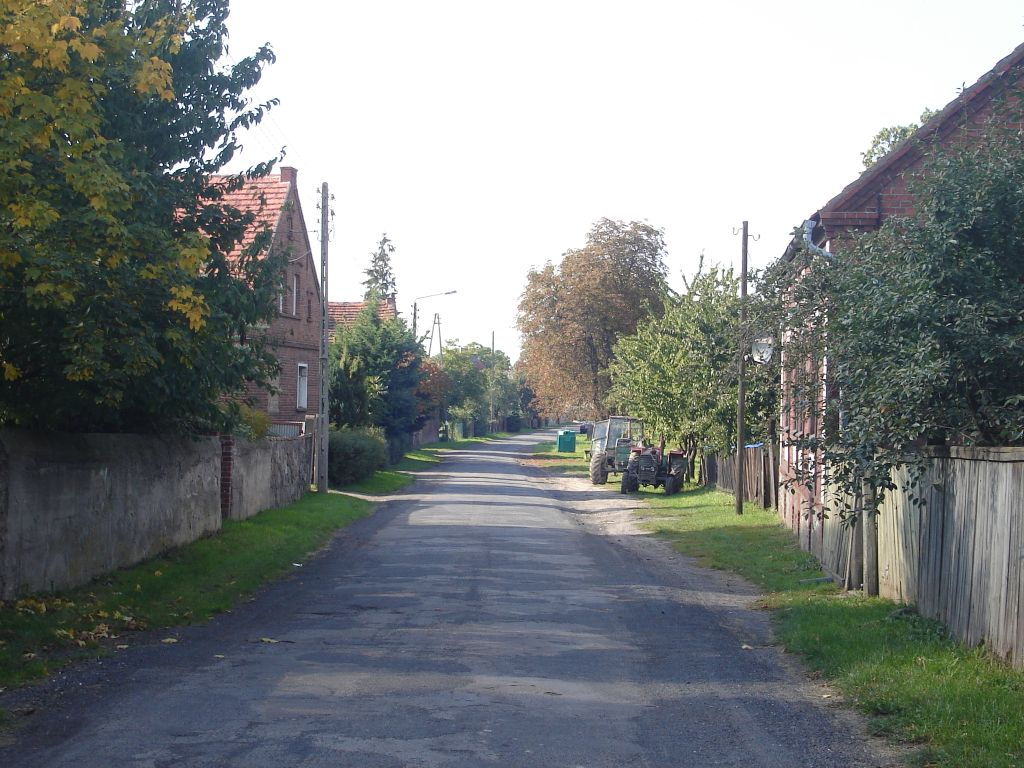

- Location within Poland
- Coordinates: 52°13′N 15°39′E
- Country: Poland
- Voivodeship: Lubusz
- County: Świebodzin
- Gmina: Szczaniec
- Population: 136
- Website: http://www.wolimirzyce.prv.pl

Wolimirzyce [vɔlimiˈʐɨt͡sɛ] is a village in the administrative district of Gmina Szczaniec, within Świebodzin County, Lubusz Voivodeship, in western Poland.
