= Opalewo =

- Village
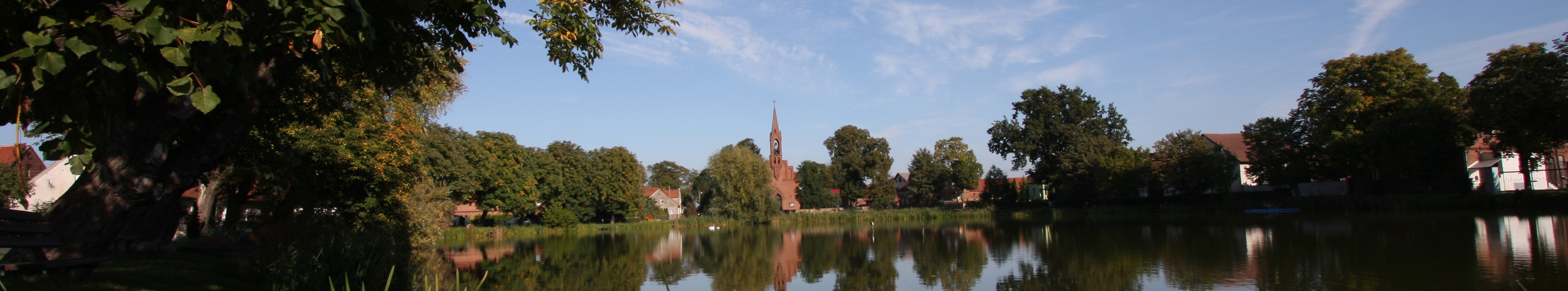
- Panorama of Opalewo

- Location within Poland
- Coordinates: 52°12′59″N 15°42′24″E
- Country: Poland
- Voivodeship: Lubusz
- County: Świebodzin
- Gmina: Szczaniec
- Population: 165

Opalewo [ɔpaˈlɛvɔ] is a village in the administrative district of Gmina Szczaniec, within Świebodzin County, Lubusz Voivodeship, in western Poland.
