= Wycinki, Masovian Voivodeship =

Wycinki
- Village
- Location within Poland
- Coordinates: 52°39′32″N 20°26′37″E
- Country: Poland
- Voivodeship: Masovian
- County: Płońsk
- Gmina: Sochocin

Wycinki [vɨˈt͡ɕiŋki] is a village in the administrative district of Gmina Sochocin, within Płońsk County, Masovian Voivodeship, in east-central Poland.
