= Ostrowy, Greater Poland Voivodeship =

Ostrowy
- Settlement
- Location within Poland
- Coordinates: 52°23′40″N 18°19′48″E
- Country: Poland
- Voivodeship: Greater Poland
- County: Konin
- Gmina: Ślesin
- Population: 19
- Time zone: UTC+1 (CET)
  - Summer (DST): UTC+2 (CEST)

Ostrowy [ɔsˈtrɔvɨ] is a settlement in the administrative district of Gmina Ślesin, within Konin County, Greater Poland Voivodeship, in central Poland.
