= Dąbrowa Mała, Greater Poland Voivodeship =

Dąbrowa Mała
- Village
- Location within Poland
- Coordinates: 52°21′N 18°16′E
- Country: Poland
- Voivodeship: Greater Poland
- County: Konin
- Gmina: Ślesin
- Population: 88

Dąbrowa Mała [dɔmˈbrɔva ˈmawa] is a village in the administrative district of Gmina Ślesin, within Konin County, Greater Poland Voivodeship, in west-central Poland.
