= Żelechy, Masovian Voivodeship =

Żelechy
- Village
- Location within Poland
- Coordinates: 52°40′34″N 20°26′3″E
- Country: Poland
- Voivodeship: Masovian
- County: Płońsk
- Gmina: Sochocin

Żelechy [ʐɛˈlɛxɨ] is a village in the administrative district of Gmina Sochocin, within Płońsk County, Masovian Voivodeship, in east-central Poland.

According to the Polish census of 2021, there population was 103.
