= Bolęcin, Płońsk County =

Bolęcin
- Village
- Location within Poland
- Coordinates: 52°39′38″N 20°31′45″E
- Country: Poland
- Voivodeship: Masovian
- County: Płońsk
- Gmina: Sochocin

Bolęcin [bɔˈlɛnt͡ɕin] is a village in the administrative district of Gmina Sochocin, within Płońsk County, Masovian Voivodeship, in east-central Poland.
