= Ślesin =

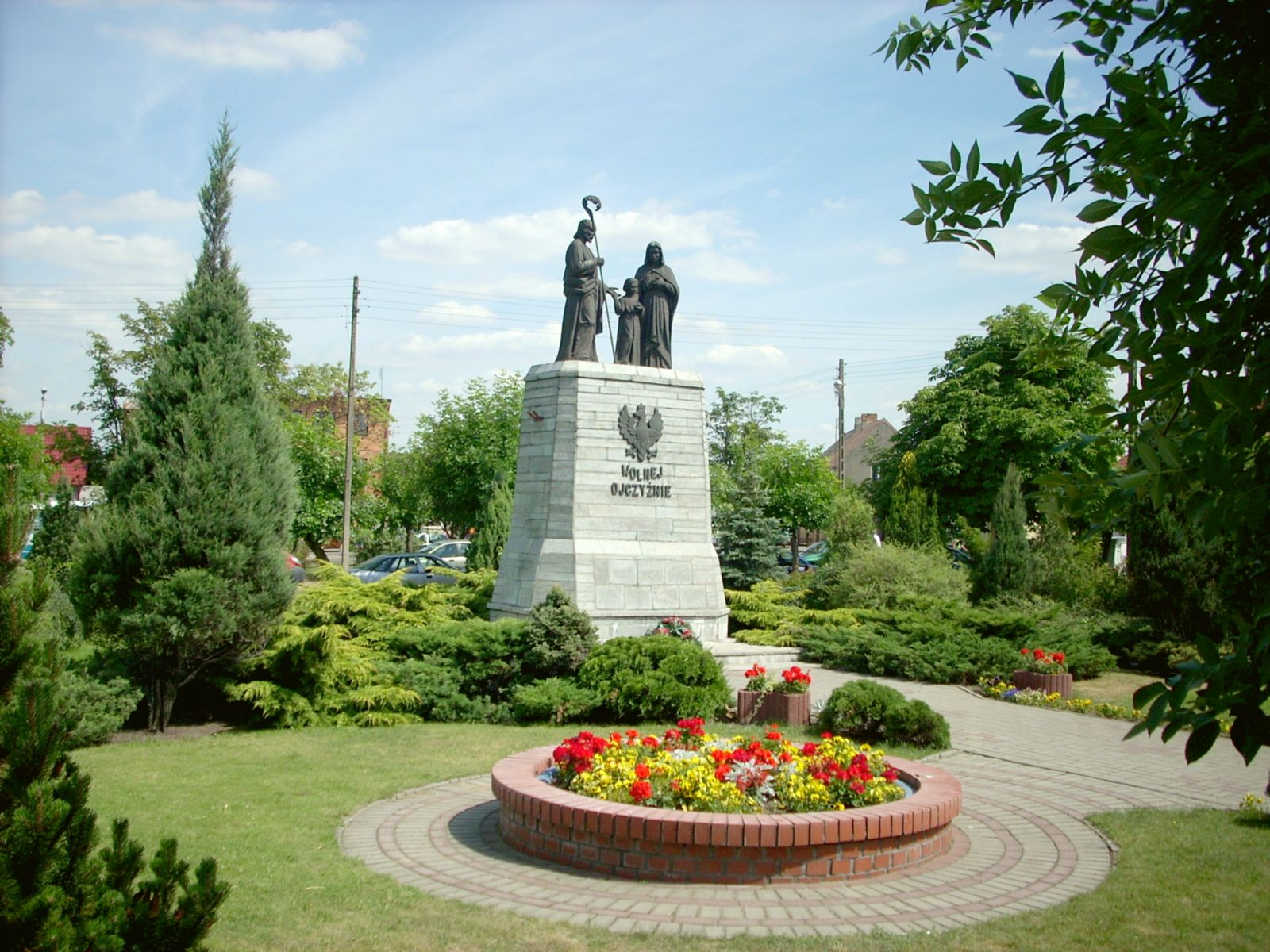
- Holy Family Monument, landmark to commemorate the independence of Poland

- Coat of arms

- Location within Poland
- Coordinates: 52°22′N 18°18′E
- Country: Poland
- Voivodeship: Greater Poland
- County: Konin
- Gmina: Ślesin
- First mentioned: 1231
- Town rights: 1358

Area
  - Total: 7.18 km^{2} (2.77 sq mi)

Population (2010)
  - Total: 3,200
  - Density: 450/km^{2} (1,200/sq mi)
- Time zone: UTC+1 (CET)
  - Summer (DST): UTC+2 (CEST)
- Postal code: 62-561
- Vehicle registration: PKN
- Website: http://www.slesin.pl

Ślesin [ˈɕlɛɕin] (Yiddish: שלעשין or Shleshin) is a town in Konin County, Greater Poland Voivodeship, in central Poland, with 3,200 inhabitants (2010).

== History ==
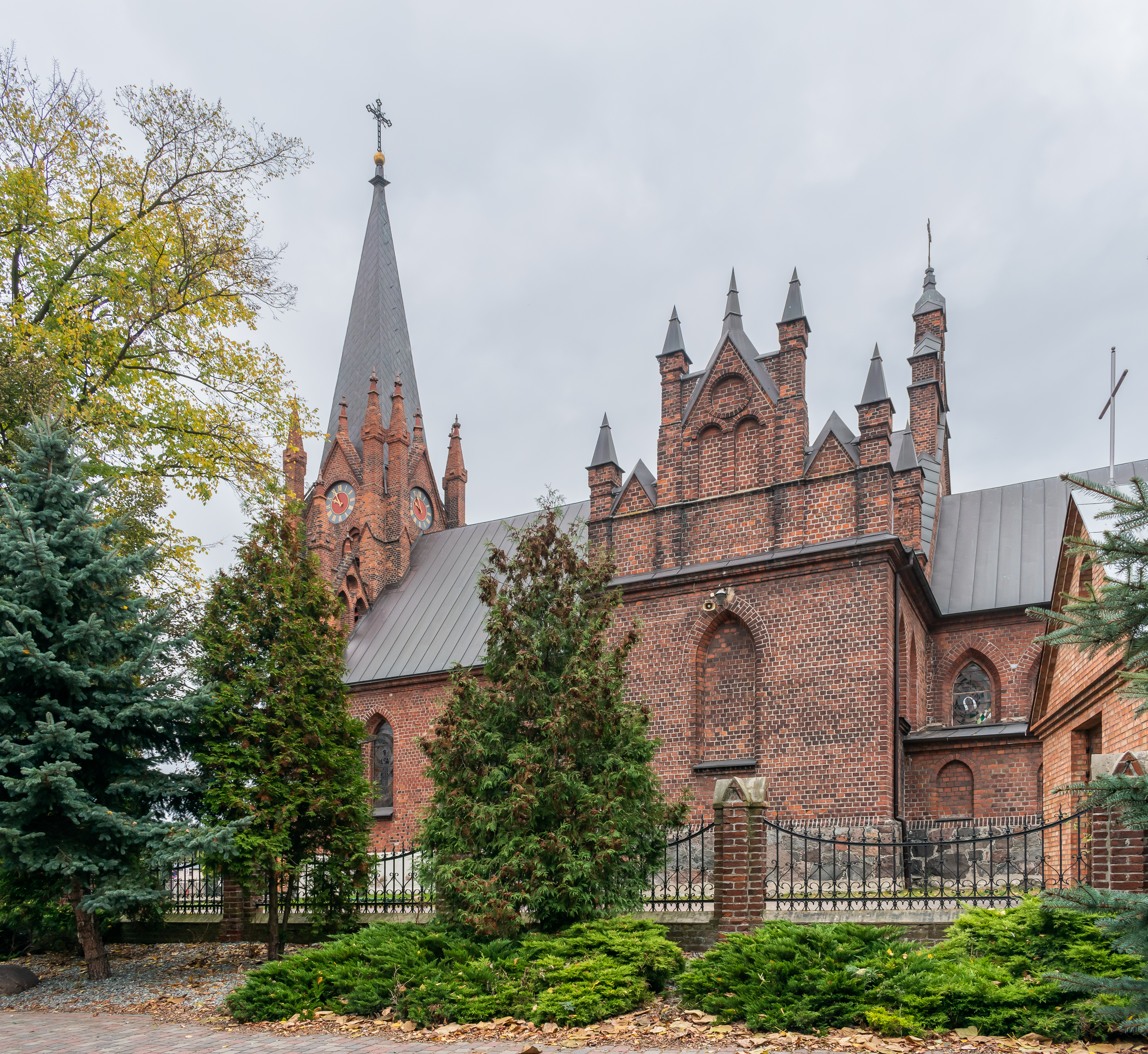
Saint Nicholas and Good Shepherd church

The oldest known mention of Ślesin comes from a document of Polish monarch Konrad I of Masovia from 1231. It was granted town rights in 1358 by King Casimir III the Great. It was a private church town, administratively located in the Konin County in the Kalisz Voivodeship in the Greater Poland Province of the Kingdom of Poland.

Following the Second Partition of Poland in 1793, the town was annexed by Prussia. After the successful Greater Poland uprising of 1806, it was regained by Poles and included within the short-lived Duchy of Warsaw. After the duchy's dissolution, it fell to the Russian-controlled Congress Kingdom in 1815. Battles of the January Uprising between Polish insurgents and Russian troops were fought near Ślesin on March 22 and October 10, 1863. The town eventually returned to Poland when the country regained its independence in 1918.

During World War II, Ślesin was occupied by the Wehrmacht on 13 September 1939, annexed to Nazi Germany from 1939 to 1945 and administered as part of the newly formed province of Reichsgau Wartheland. The town had 280 Jews just before World War II. They were forced into slave labor during the occupation and expelled from the town on July 15, 1940, to ghettos in Zagórów and Grodziec, from which they were sent to death camps. The town was liberated by the Red Army on 20 January 1945 during the Vistula–Oder Offensive, and restored to Poland.

== Demographics ==
Historical population

Year	Pop.	±%
1910	1,702	—
1921	2,078	+22.1%
1931	2,495	+20.1%
1939	2,804	+12.4%

Year	Pop.	±%
1950	1,802	−35.7%
1960	1,977	+9.7%
2010	3,200	+61.9%

== Transport ==
National road 25 bypasses Ślesin to the west.

Voivodeship road 263 passes right through Ślesin.

The nearest railway station is in Konin.
