= Elisabeth Lupka =

Female Nazi guard (1902–1949)

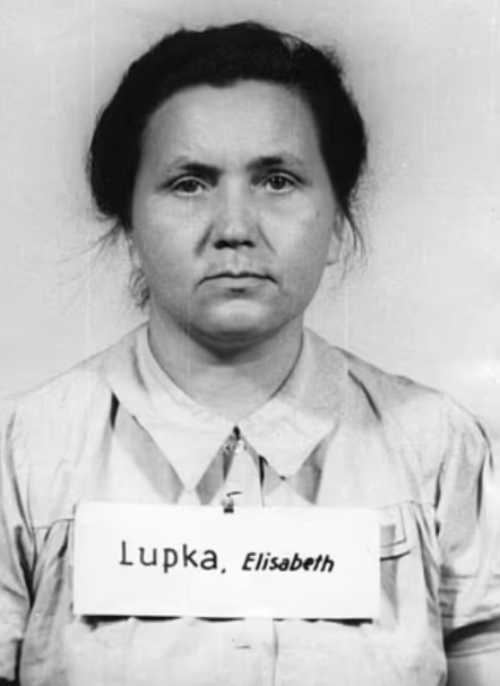
- Lupka after her arrest
- Born: 27 October 1902; Klein-Damner, German Empire
- Died: 8 January 1949 (aged 46); Montelupich Prison, Kraków, Polish People's Republic
- Status: Executed by hanging
- Conviction: Crimes against humanity
- Penalty: Death

Elisabeth Lupka (27 October 1902 – 8 January 1949) was a Nazi female guard at two prison camps during World War II.

Lupka was born in Klein-Damner, German Empire (present-day Dąbrówka Mała, Lubusz Voivodeship, Poland). She got married in 1934, had no children and soon divorced. In 1937 she went to Berlin to work in an aircraft factory.

In 1942 she left her menial job as a labourer and went to Ravensbrück concentration camp to undergo training as a camp guard. Lupka graduated and later became an Aufseherin over several work details. In March 1943, she was assigned to the German Auschwitz-Birkenau camp in Poland as an Aufseherin then as a Blockführerin (Block Overseer), where she physically beat many prisoners with a whip and selected many others for the gas chambers. She stayed in the camp until its last evacuations in early January 1945 and accompanied a death march to Loslau. Lupka returned to Ravensbrück later that same month.

On 6 June 1945, Lupka was arrested by Allied troops and sent to an internment camp. Two years later, on 6 July 1948, after a long investigation, she appeared at a Kraków court for war crimes, mainly the maltreatment of prisoners and her involvement in selections of inmates to the gas chambers. Lupka was found guilty, and executed by short-drop hanging on 8 January 1949 at Montelupich Prison in Kraków. Her corpse was sent to Jagiellonian University in Krakow for use by medical students.
