= Gmina Sochocin =

Gmina Sochocin Sochocin Commune
- Gmina
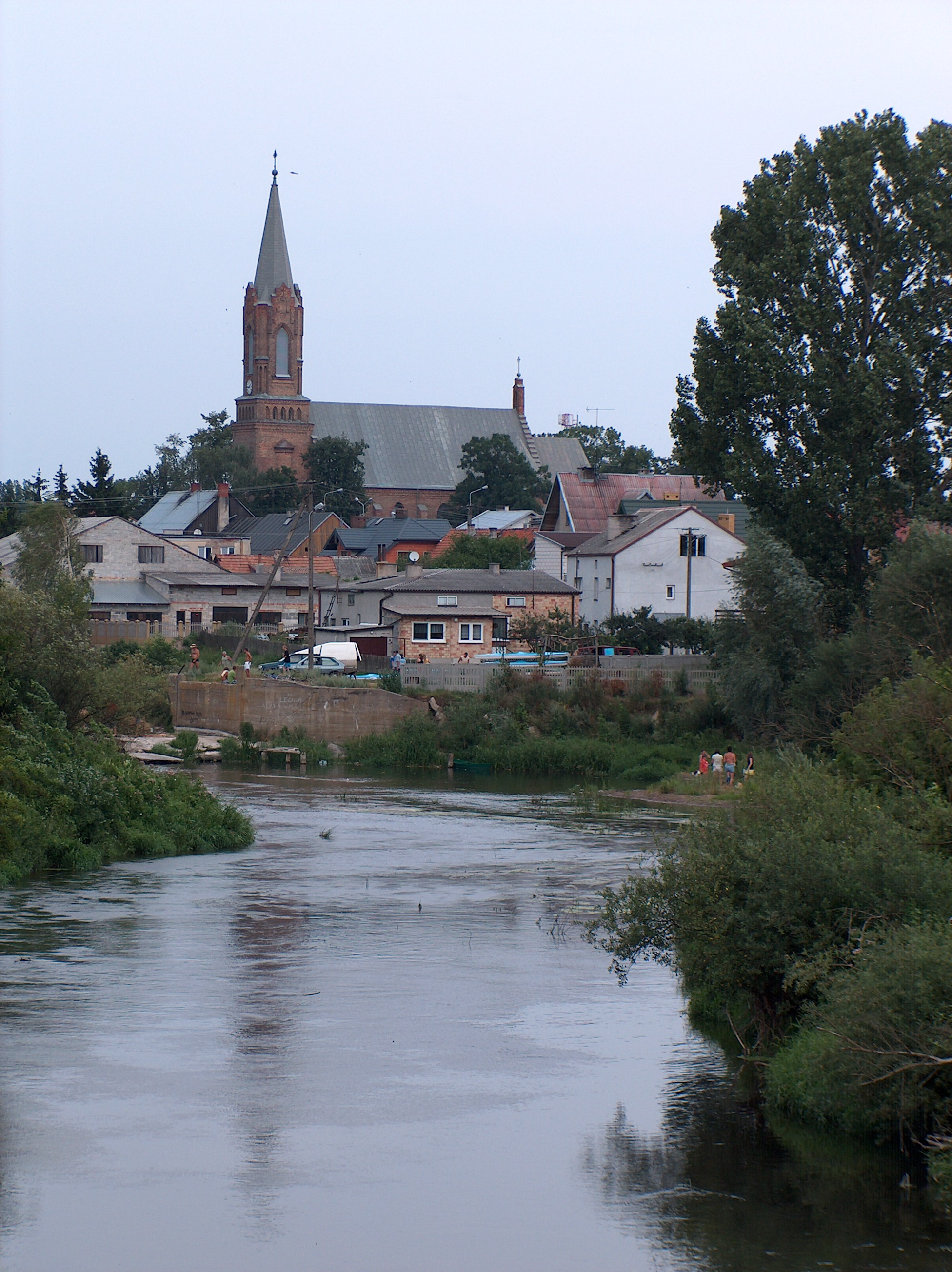

- Flag Coat of arms
- Interactive map of Gmina Sochocin
- Coordinates (Sochocin): 52°41′N 20°28′E
- Country: Poland
- Voivodeship: Masovian
- County: Płońsk
- Seat: Sochocin

Area
  - Total: 119.67 km^{2} (46.20 sq mi)

Population (2013)
  - Total: 5,893
  - Density: 49.24/km^{2} (127.5/sq mi)
- Website: www.sochocin.pl

Gmina Sochocin is a rural gmina (administrative district) in Płońsk County, Masovian Voivodeship, in east-central Poland. Its seat is the village of Sochocin, which lies approximately 8 kilometres (5 mi) north-east of Płońsk and 64 km (40 mi) north-west of Warsaw.

The gmina covers an area of 119.67 square kilometres (46.2 sq mi), and as of 2006 its total population is 5,713 (5,893 in 2013).

== Villages ==
Gmina Sochocin contains the villages and settlements of:

- Baraki
- Biele
- Bolęcin
- Budy Gutarzewskie
- Ciemniewo
- Drożdżyn
- Gromadzyn
- Gutarzewo
- Idzikowice
- Jędrzejewo
- Kępa
- Koliszewo
- Kolonia Sochocin
- Kołoząb
- Kondrajec
- Kuchary Królewskie
- Kuchary Żydowskie
- Milewo
- Niewikla
- Podsmardzewo
- Rzy
- Ślepowrony
- Smardzewo
- Sochocin
- Wierzbówiec
- Wycinki
- Żelechy

== Neighbouring gminas ==
Gmina Sochocin is bordered by the gminas of Baboszewo, Glinojeck, Joniec, Nowe Miasto, Ojrzeń, Płońsk and Sońsk.
