= Półwiosek Stary =

- Village
- Location within Poland
- Coordinates: 52°21′28″N 18°18′21″E
- Country: Poland
- Voivodeship: Greater Poland
- County: Konin
- Gmina: Ślesin
- Elevation: 81 m (266 ft)
- Population: 287

Półwiosek Stary [puu̯ˈvjɔsɛk ˈstarɨ] is a village in the administrative district of Gmina Ślesin, within Konin County, Greater Poland Voivodeship, in west-central Poland.
