= Gromadzyn =

- Village
- Location within Poland
- Coordinates: 52°40′N 20°29′E
- Country: Poland
- Voivodeship: Masovian
- County: Płońsk
- Gmina: Sochocin

Gromadzyn [ɡrɔˈmad͡zɨn] is a village in the administrative district of Gmina Sochocin, within Płońsk County, Masovian Voivodeship, in east-central Poland.
