= Ignacewo, Konin County =

Ignacewo
- Village
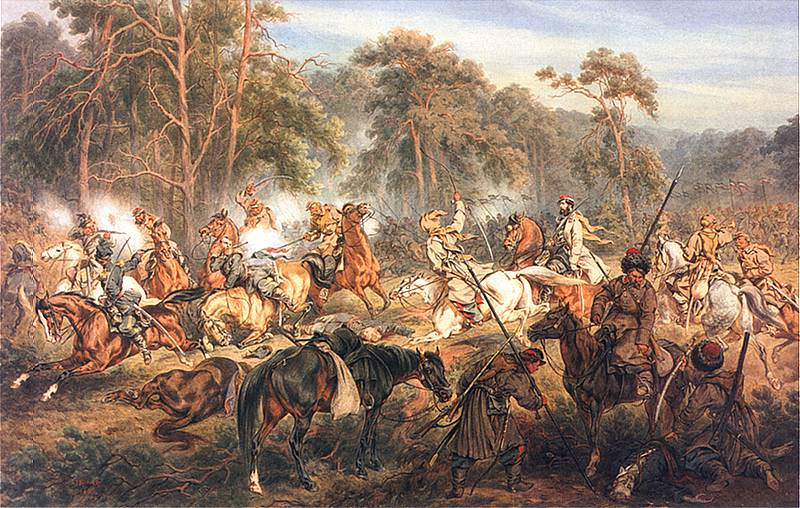
- First Battle of Ignacewo of 1863 on a painting by Juliusz Kossak

- Location within Poland
- Coordinates: 52°23′N 18°26′E
- Country: Poland
- Voivodeship: Greater Poland
- County: Konin
- Gmina: Ślesin
- Time zone: UTC+1 (CET)
  - Summer (DST): UTC+2 (CEST)
- Vehicle registration: PKN

Ignacewo [iɡnaˈt͡sɛvɔ] is a village in the administrative district of Gmina Ślesin, within Konin County, Greater Poland Voivodeship, in central Poland.

Ignacewo was the site of two battles of the January Uprising between Polish insurgents and Russian troops. The First Battle of Ignacewo on May 8, 1863 was lost by the Poles, while the Second Battle of Ignacewo on June 9, 1863 ended in a Polish victory.
