= Koliszewo =

- Village
- Location within Poland
- Coordinates: 52°41′00″N 20°26′00″E
- Country: Poland
- Voivodeship: Masovian
- County: Płońsk
- Gmina: Sochocin
- Population: 196

Koliszewo [kɔliˈʂɛvɔ] is a village in the administrative district of Gmina Sochocin, within Płońsk County, Masovian Voivodeship, in east-central Poland.
