= Ojerzyce =

- Village
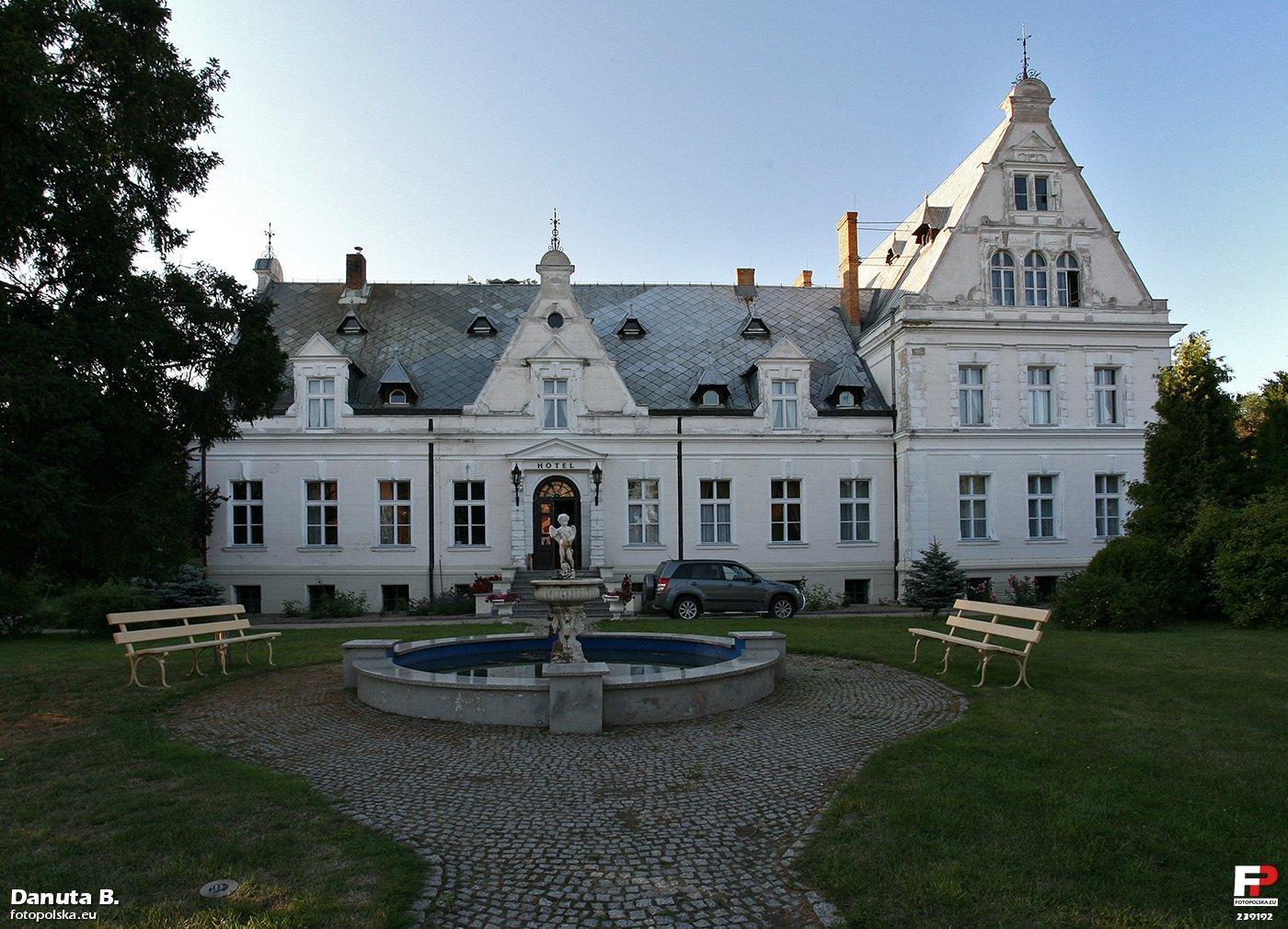
- Palace

- Location within Poland
- Coordinates: 52°15′N 15°38′E
- Country: Poland
- Voivodeship: Lubusz
- County: Świebodzin
- Gmina: Szczaniec
- Population: 208

Ojerzyce [ɔjɛˈʐɨt͡sɛ] (German: Oggerschütz) is a village in the administrative district of Gmina Szczaniec, within Świebodzin County, Lubusz Voivodeship, in western Poland.
