= Milewo, Płońsk County =

Milewo
- Village
- Location within Poland
- Coordinates: 52°40′09″N 20°25′05″E
- Country: Poland
- Voivodeship: Masovian
- County: Płońsk
- Gmina: Sochocin

Milewo [miˈlɛvɔ] is a village in the administrative district of Gmina Sochocin, within Płońsk County, Masovian Voivodeship, in east-central Poland.
