= Konstantynowo =

Konstantynowo may refer to the following places:

- Konstantynowo, Chodzież County in Greater Poland Voivodeship (west-central Poland)
- Konstantynowo, Konin County in Greater Poland Voivodeship (west-central Poland)
- Konstantynowo, Kuyavian-Pomeranian Voivodeship (north-central Poland)
- Konstantynowo, Piła County in Greater Poland Voivodeship (west-central Poland)
- Konstantynowo, Poznań County in Greater Poland Voivodeship (west-central Poland)
- Konstantynowo, Gmina Zaniemyśl, Środa County in Greater Poland Voivodeship (west-central Poland)
