= Głębockie-Witalisów =

- Village
- Location within Poland
- Coordinates: 52°24′02″N 18°20′55″E
- Country: Poland
- Voivodeship: Greater Poland
- County: Konin
- Gmina: Ślesin
- Population: 29

Głębockie-Witalisów [ɡwɛmˈbɔt͡skʲɛ vitaˈlisuf] is a village in the administrative district of Gmina Ślesin, within Konin County, Greater Poland Voivodeship, in west-central Poland.
