= Gutarzewo =

- Village
- Location within Poland
- Coordinates: 52°42′36″N 20°27′10″E
- Country: Poland
- Voivodeship: Masovian
- County: Płońsk
- Gmina: Sochocin
- Population: 163

Gutarzewo [ɡutaˈʐɛvɔ] is a village in the administrative district of Gmina Sochocin, within Płońsk County, Masovian Voivodeship, in east-central Poland.
