= Pogoń Gosławicka =

- Village
- Location within Poland
- Coordinates: 52°21′0″N 18°24′26″E
- Country: Poland
- Voivodeship: Greater Poland
- County: Konin
- Gmina: Ślesin
- Population: 97

Pogoń Gosławicka (Polish pronunciation: [ˈpɔɡɔj̃ ɡɔswaˈvitska]) is a village in the administrative district of Gmina Ślesin, within Konin County, Greater Poland Voivodeship, in west-central Poland.
