= Ostrowąż =

- Village
- Location within Poland
- Coordinates: 52°25′N 18°14′E
- Country: Poland
- Voivodeship: Greater Poland
- County: Konin
- Gmina: Ślesin
- Population: 170

Ostrowąż [ɔsˈtrɔvɔ̃ʂ] is a village in the administrative district of Gmina Ślesin, within Konin County, Greater Poland Voivodeship, in west-central Poland.
