= Konstantynówek =

- Settlement
- Location within Poland
- Coordinates: 52°23′46″N 18°19′40″E
- Country: Poland
- Voivodeship: Greater Poland
- County: Konin
- Gmina: Ślesin
- Population: 9

Konstantynówek [kɔnstantɨˈnuvɛk] is a settlement in the administrative district of Gmina Ślesin, within Konin County, Greater Poland Voivodeship, in west-central Poland.
