= Biskupie, Greater Poland Voivodeship =

Biskupie
- Village
- Location within Poland
- Coordinates: 52°23′N 18°15′E
- Country: Poland
- Voivodeship: Greater Poland
- County: Konin
- Gmina: Ślesin

Biskupie [bisˈkupjɛ] is a village in the administrative district of Gmina Ślesin, within Konin County, Greater Poland Voivodeship, in west-central Poland.
