= Smolniki, Konin County =

Smolniki
- Village
- Location within Poland
- Coordinates: 52°21′54″N 18°24′40″E
- Country: Poland
- Voivodeship: Greater Poland
- County: Konin
- Gmina: Ślesin

Smolniki [smɔlˈniki] is a village in the administrative district of Gmina Ślesin, within Konin County, Greater Poland Voivodeship, in west-central Poland.
