= Kolonia Sochocin =

- Village
- Location within Poland
- Coordinates: 52°40′59″N 20°27′18″E
- Country: Poland
- Voivodeship: Masovian
- County: Płońsk
- Gmina: Sochocin

Kolonia Sochocin [kɔˈlɔɲa sɔˈxɔt͡ɕin] is a village in the administrative district of Gmina Sochocin, within Płońsk County, Masovian Voivodeship, in east-central Poland.
