= Baraki, Masovian Voivodeship =

Baraki
- Village
- Location within Poland
- Coordinates: 52°43′33″N 20°27′22″E
- Country: Poland
- Voivodeship: Masovian
- County: Płońsk
- Gmina: Sochocin

Baraki [baˈraki] is a village in the administrative district of Gmina Sochocin, within Płońsk County, Masovian Voivodeship, in east-central Poland.
