= Sarnówka =

Sarnówka may refer to:

- Sarnówka, Kuyavian-Pomeranian Voivodeship, a village in the administrative district of Gmina Lubanie, Włocławek County, Poland
- Sarnówka, Greater Poland Voivodeship, a village in the administrative district of Gmina Rawicz, Rawicz County, Poland

== See also ==
- Sarnowa (disambiguation)
