= Kiełcze =

- Village
- Location within Poland
- Coordinates: 52°12′N 15°38′E
- Country: Poland
- Voivodeship: Lubusz
- County: Świebodzin
- Gmina: Szczaniec
- Population: 85
- Website: http://www.kielcze.prv.pl

Kiełcze [ˈkʲɛu̯t͡ʂɛ] is a village in the administrative district of Gmina Szczaniec, within Świebodzin County, Lubusz Voivodeship, in western Poland.
