= Dąbrówka Mała, Lubusz Voivodeship =

Dąbrówka Mała
- Village
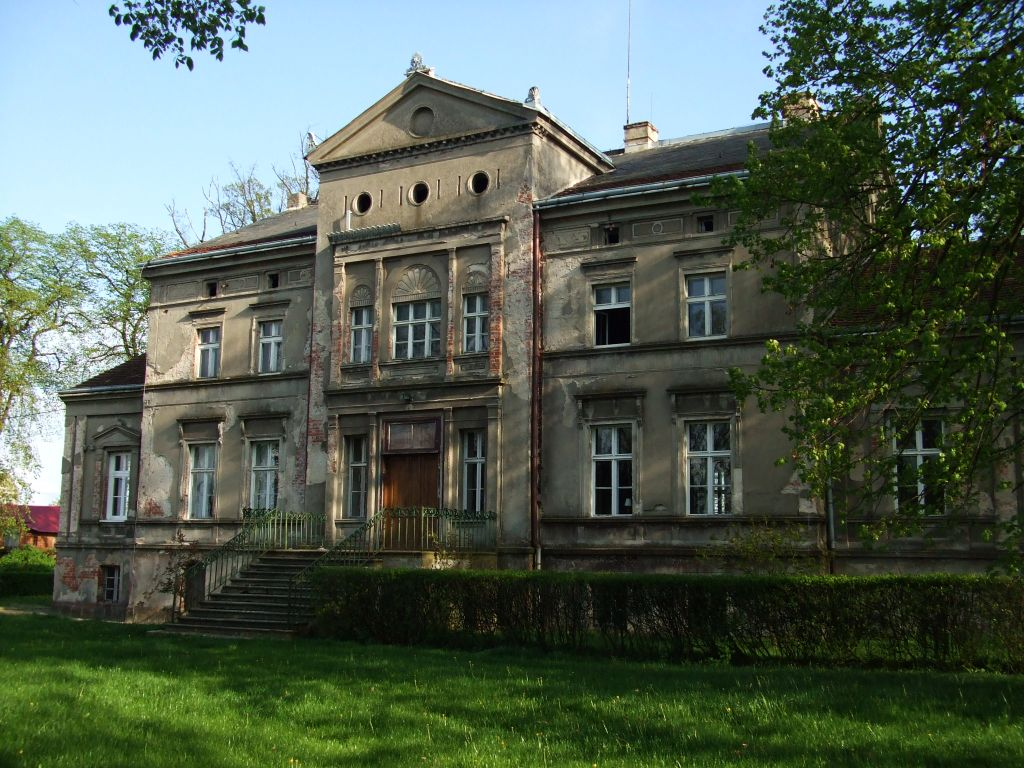
- Palace in Dąbrówka Mała

- Location within Poland
- Coordinates: 52°14′N 15°42′E
- Country: Poland
- Voivodeship: Lubusz
- County: Świebodzin
- Gmina: Szczaniec
- Population: 296
- Time zone: UTC+1 (CET)
  - Summer (DST): UTC+2 (CEST)
- Vehicle registration: FSW

Dąbrówka Mała [dɔmˈbrufka ˈmawa] (German: Klein Dammer) is a village in the administrative district of Gmina Szczaniec, within Świebodzin County, Lubusz Voivodeship, in western Poland.

== Notable residents ==
- Elisabeth Lupka (1902–1949), Nazi concentration camp guard executed for war crimes
