= Niedźwiady Małe =

- Village
- Location within Poland
- Coordinates: 52°19′44″N 18°20′48″E
- Country: Poland
- Voivodeship: Greater Poland
- County: Konin
- Gmina: Ślesin
- Population: 114

Niedźwiady Małe [ɲɛd͡ʑˈvjadɨ ˈmawɛ] is a village in the administrative district of Gmina Ślesin, within Konin County, Greater Poland Voivodeship, in west-central Poland.
