= Ostrowąż-Giętkowo =

- Village
- Location within Poland
- Coordinates: 52°24′38″N 18°14′37″E
- Country: Poland
- Voivodeship: Greater Poland
- County: Konin
- Gmina: Ślesin
- Population: 60

Ostrowąż-Giętkowo [ɔsˈtrɔvɔ̃ʂ ɡʲɛntˈkɔvɔ] is a village in the administrative district of Gmina Ślesin, within Konin County, Greater Poland Voivodeship, in west-central Poland.
