= Dąbrowa Duża, Greater Poland Voivodeship =

Dąbrowa Duża
- Village
- Location within Poland
- Coordinates: 52°21′N 18°16′E
- Country: Poland
- Voivodeship: Greater Poland
- County: Konin
- Gmina: Ślesin

Dąbrowa Duża [dɔmˈbrɔva ˈduʐa] is a village in the administrative district of Gmina Ślesin, within Konin County, Greater Poland Voivodeship, in west-central Poland.
