= Kępa =

Kępa [ˈkɛmpa] may refer to the following places in Poland:

- Kępa, Lower Silesian Voivodeship (south-west Poland)
- Kępa, Kuyavian-Pomeranian Voivodeship (north-central Poland)
- Kępa, Chełm County in Lublin Voivodeship (east Poland)
- Kępa, Lublin County in Lublin Voivodeship (east Poland)
- Kępa, Łódź Voivodeship (central Poland)
- Kępa, Dąbrowa County in Lesser Poland Voivodeship (south Poland)
- Kępa, Kraków County in Lesser Poland Voivodeship (south Poland)
- Kępa, Płońsk County in Masovian Voivodeship (east-central Poland)
- Kępa, Siedlce County in Masovian Voivodeship (east-central Poland)
- Kępa, Czarnków-Trzcianka County in Greater Poland Voivodeship (west-central Poland)
- Kępa, Konin County in Greater Poland Voivodeship (west-central Poland)
- Kępa, Szamotuły County in Greater Poland Voivodeship (west-central Poland)
- Kępa, Opole Voivodeship (south-west Poland)
- Kępa, Pomeranian Voivodeship (north Poland)
- Kępa, Warmian-Masurian Voivodeship (north Poland)
- Kępa, West Pomeranian Voivodeship (north-west Poland)
