= Wygoda, Gmina Ślesin =

Wygoda
- Village
- Location within Poland
- Coordinates: 51°51′20″N 18°23′21″E
- Country: Poland
- Voivodeship: Greater Poland
- County: Konin
- Gmina: Ślesin

Wygoda [vɨˈɡɔda] is a village in the administrative district of Gmina Ślesin, within Konin County, Greater Poland Voivodeship, in west-central Poland.
