= Sochocin =

- Town
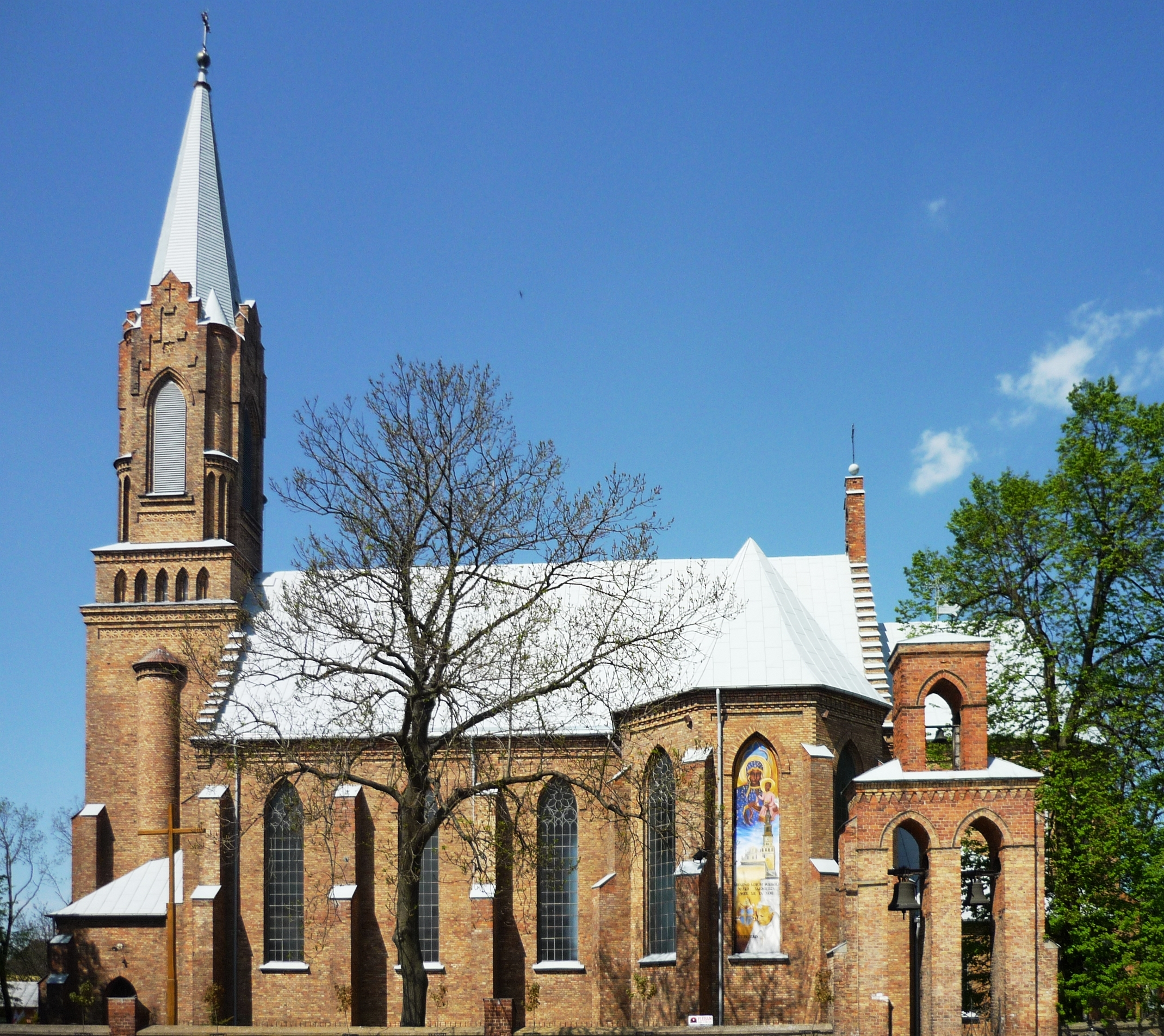
- Church of Saint John the Baptist

- Coat of arms

- Location within Poland
- Coordinates: 52°41′N 20°28′E
- Country: Poland
- Voivodeship: Masovian
- County: Płońsk
- Gmina: Sochocin
- Town rights: 1385

Population
  - Total: 1,945
- Time zone: UTC+1 (CET)
  - Summer (DST): UTC+2 (CEST)
- Vehicle registration: WPN
- Website: http://www.sochocin.pl

Sochocin [sɔˈxɔt͡ɕin] is a town in Płońsk County, Masovian Voivodeship, in central Poland. It is the seat of the gmina (administrative district) called Gmina Sochocin.

The town has a population of 1,945.

== History ==
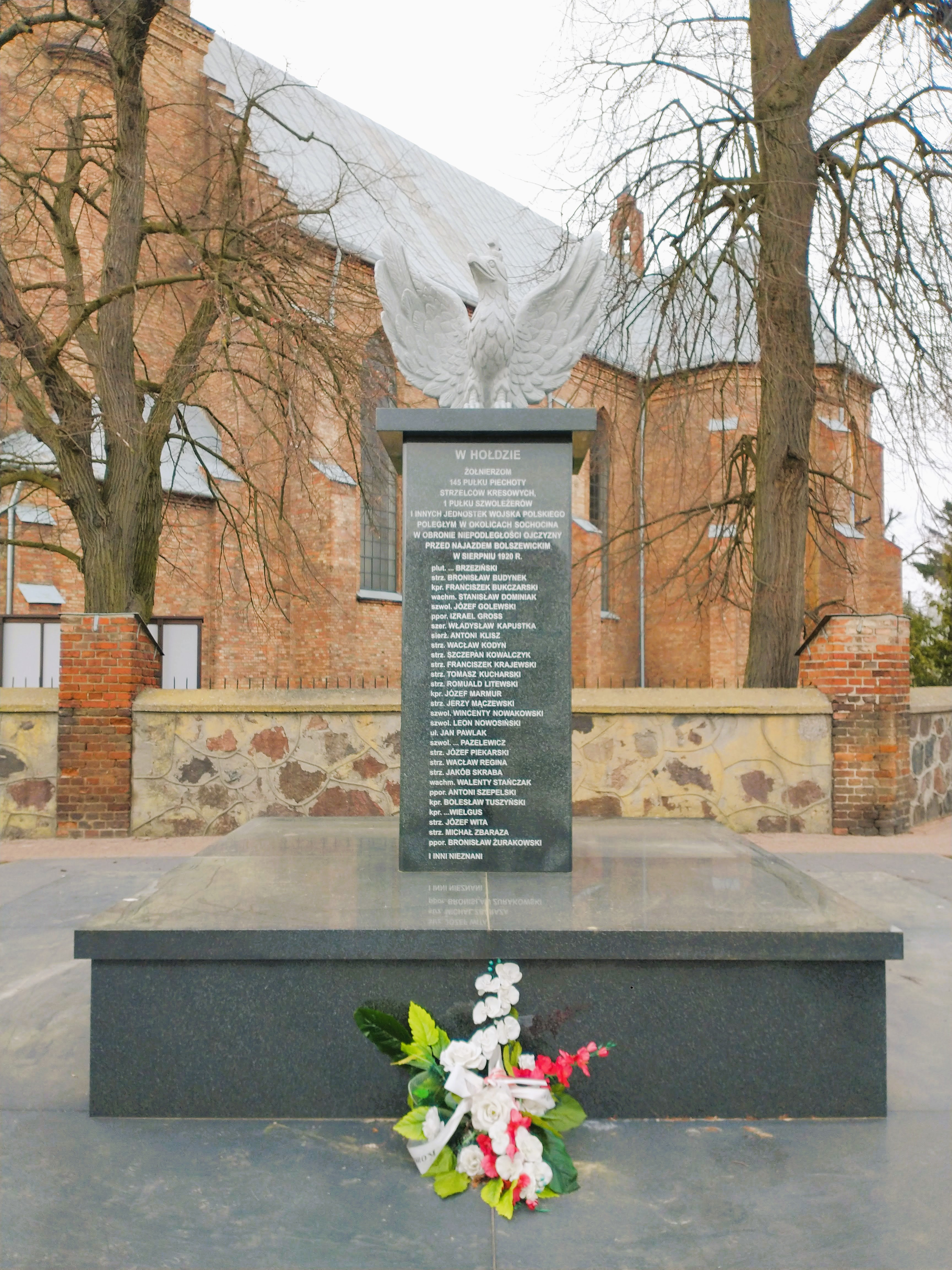
Memorial to soldiers fallen in the Battle of Sochocin in 1920

Sochocin was granted town rights in 1385. It was a county seat and royal town, administratively located in the Masovian Voivodeship in the Greater Poland Province of the Kingdom of Poland.

During the Polish–Soviet War, on August 14–15, 1920, it was the site of a battle between Poles and the invading Russian 15th Army, won by the Poles.

During the German occupation of Poland (World War II), in 1941, the German gendermerie expelled the entire Polish population of the settlement, which was then enslaved as forced labour in the county and region, while the houses and farms were handed over to German colonists as part of the Lebensraum policy.

== Sports ==
The local football club is Wkra Sochocin. It competes in the lower leagues.
