= Kuchary Królewskie =

- Village
- Location within Poland
- Coordinates: 52°41′09″N 20°32′28″E
- Country: Poland
- Voivodeship: Masovian
- County: Płońsk
- Gmina: Sochocin

Kuchary Królewskie [kuˈxarɨ kruˈlɛfskʲɛ] is a village in the administrative district of Gmina Sochocin, within Płońsk County, Masovian Voivodeship, in east-central Poland.
