= Lizawy =

- Village
- Location within Poland
- Coordinates: 52°21′40″N 18°15′55″E
- Country: Poland
- Voivodeship: Greater Poland
- County: Konin
- Gmina: Ślesin
- Population: 67

Lizawy [liˈzavɨ] is a village in the administrative district of Gmina Ślesin, within Konin County, Greater Poland Voivodeship, in west-central Poland.
