= Gmina Szczaniec =

Gmina Szczaniec Szczaniec Commune
- Gmina
- Flag Coat of arms

- Location within Poland
- Coordinates (Szczaniec): 52°16′N 15°41′E
- Country: Poland
- Voivodeship: Lubusz
- County: Świebodzin
- Seat: Szczaniec

Area
  - Total: 112.92 km^{2} (43.60 sq mi)

Population (2019-06-30)
  - Total: 3,847
  - Density: 34.07/km^{2} (88.24/sq mi)
- Website: www.szczaniec.pl

Gmina Szczaniec is a rural gmina (administrative district) in Świebodzin County, Lubusz Voivodeship, in western Poland. Its seat is the village of Szczaniec, which lies approximately 11 kilometres (7 mi) east of Świebodzin, 39 km (24 mi) north of Zielona Góra, and 60 km (37 mi) south-east of Gorzów Wielkopolski.

The gmina covers an area of 112.92 square kilometres (43.6 sq mi), and as of 2019 its total population is 3,847.

== Villages ==
Gmina Szczaniec contains the villages and settlements of Brudzewo, Dąbrówka Mała, Kiełcze, Koźminek, Myszęcin, Nowe Karcze, Ojerzyce, Opalewo, Smardzewo, Szczaniec, Wilenko and Wolimirzyce.

== Neighbouring gminas ==
Gmina Szczaniec is bordered by the gminas of Babimost, Sulechów, Świebodzin, Trzciel and Zbąszynek.

== Twin towns – sister cities ==
Gmina Szczaniec is twinned with:

- Groß Pankow, Germany
