= Ostrowąż-Kolonia =

- Village
- Location within Poland
- Coordinates: 52°25′29″N 18°15′21″E
- Country: Poland
- Voivodeship: Greater Poland
- County: Konin
- Gmina: Ślesin
- Population: 79

Ostrowąż-Kolonia [ɔsˈtrɔvɔ̃ʂ kɔˈlɔɲa] is a village in the administrative district of Gmina Ślesin, within Konin County, Greater Poland Voivodeship, in west-central Poland.
