= Lubomyśle =

- Village
- Location within Poland
- Coordinates: 52°22′N 18°17′E
- Country: Poland
- Voivodeship: Greater Poland
- County: Konin
- Gmina: Ślesin

Lubomyśle [lubɔˈmɨɕlɛ] is a village in the administrative district of Gmina Ślesin, within Konin County, Greater Poland Voivodeship, in west-central Poland.
