= Kolebki-Frąsin =

- Village
- Location within Poland
- Coordinates: 52°22′10″N 18°21′57″E
- Country: Poland
- Voivodeship: Greater Poland
- County: Konin
- Gmina: Ślesin
- Population: 41

Kolebki-Frąsin [kɔˈlɛpki ˈfrɔ̃ɕin] is a village in the administrative district of Gmina Ślesin, within Konin County, Greater Poland Voivodeship, in west-central Poland.
