= First Battle of Ignacewo =

- Part of the January Uprising
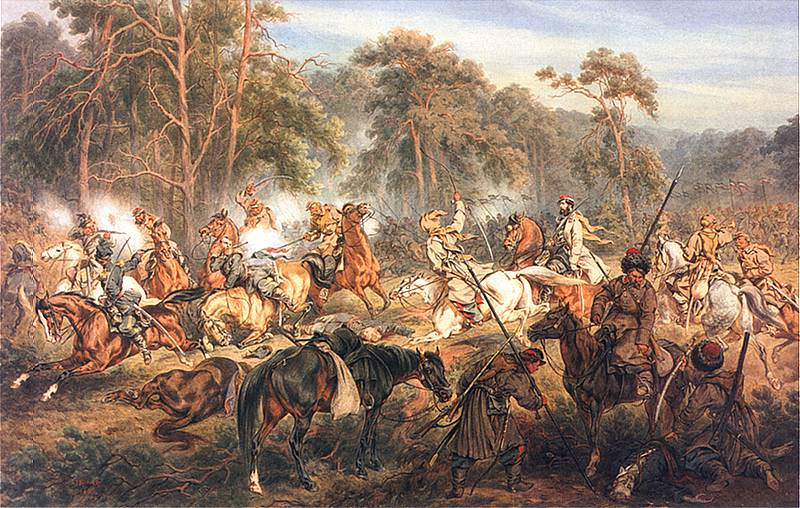
- Battle of Ignacewo, 19th-century painting by Juliusz Kossak
Date	8 May 1863
Location	near Ignacewo
Result	Russian victory

Belligerents
(Poland) Polish insurgents	Russian Empire

Commanders and leaders
Edmund Taczanowski	Andrei Brunner

Strength
1,100	2,000

Casualties and losses
160 dead, incl. murdered wounded insurgents 80 wounded	26 dead, 67 wounded

The First Battle of Ignacewo was one of many clashes of the January Uprising. It took place on May 8, 1863, near the village of Ignacewo, which at that time belonged to Russian Empire’s Congress Poland. Insurgent forces commanded by Edmund Taczanowski clashed with a 2,000-strong detachment of the Imperial Russian Army led by Andrei Brunner. The battle ended with Russian victory, and Poles lost some 160 men.

Taczanowski all together had 1,100 men under his command, including 500 infantry riflemen, 550 kosynierzy and 50 cavalry, together with 3 cannons. The insurgents camped in the village of Ignacewo, with their positions reinforced by abatis and a rampart. Russian detachment had some 2,000 men, commanded by General Brunner. Their initial attack was repelled, but after some time, the Russians found a passage across local swamps, and clashed with weak left wing of the Poles. After breaking into the camp, they destroyed Taczanowski's party, killing 160, also by deliberate murdering of the wounded insurgents.

Polish painter Juliusz Kossak dedicated one of his paintings, Bitwa pod Ignacewem (1893), to the battle.

== Sources ==
- Stefan Kieniewicz: Powstanie styczniowe. Warszawa: Państwowe Wydawnictwo Naukowe, 1983. ISBN 83-01-03652-4.
