= Honoratka =

- Village
- Location within Poland
- Coordinates: 52°19′37″N 18°16′36″E
- Country: Poland
- Voivodeship: Greater Poland
- County: Konin
- Gmina: Ślesin
- Website: http://www.honoratka.up.pl

Honoratka [xɔnɔˈratka] is a village in the administrative district of Gmina Ślesin, within Konin County, Greater Poland Voivodeship, in west-central Poland.
