= Smolniki Polskie =

- Settlement
- Location within Poland
- Coordinates: 52°22′02″N 18°24′23″E
- Country: Poland
- Voivodeship: Greater Poland
- County: Konin
- Gmina: Ślesin
- Population: 10

Smolniki Polskie [smɔlˈniki ˈpɔlskʲɛ] is a settlement in the administrative district of Gmina Ślesin, within Konin County, Greater Poland Voivodeship, in west-central Poland.
