= Gmina Ślesin =

Gmina Ślesin Ślesin Commune
- Gmina
- Coat of arms

- Coordinates (Ślesin): 52°22′N 18°18′E
- Country: Poland
- Voivodeship: Greater Poland
- County: Konin County
- Seat: Ślesin

Area
  - Total: 145.69 km^{2} (56.25 sq mi)

Population (2006)
  - Total: 13,446
  - Density: 92.292/km^{2} (239.03/sq mi)
  - Urban: 3,102
  - Rural: 10,344
- Website: http://www.slesin.pl

Gmina Ślesin is an urban-rural gmina (administrative district) in Konin County, Greater Poland Voivodeship, in west-central Poland. Its seat is the town of Ślesin, which lies approximately 17 kilometres (11 mi) north of Konin and 95 km (59 mi) east of the regional capital Poznań.

The gmina covers an area of 145.69 square kilometres (56.3 sq mi), and as of 2006 its total population is 13,446 (out of which the population of Ślesin amounts to 3,102, and the population of the rural part of the gmina is 10,344).

== Villages ==
Apart from the town of Ślesin, Gmina Ślesin contains the villages and settlements of Biele, Biskupie, Biskupie Sarnowskie, Bylew, Bylew-Parcele, Dąbrowa Duża, Dąbrowa Mała, Florentynowo, Głębockie Drugie, Głębockie Pierwsze, Głębockie-Witalisów, Goranin, Goraninek, Holendry Wąsowskie, Honoratka, Honoratka-Władysławów, Ignacewo, Julia, Kępa, Kijowiec, Kijowiec-Ściany, Kijowiec-Szyszynek, Kijowskie Nowiny, Kolebki, Kolebki-Frąsin, Kolebki-Ługi, Konstantynówek, Konstantynowo, Leśnictwo, Licheń Stary, Lizawy, Lubomyśle, Marianowo, Mikorzyn, Niedźwiady, Niedźwiady Małe, Ostrowąż, Ostrowąż-Giętkowo, Ostrowąż-Kolonia, Ostrowy, Piotrkowice, Pogoń Gosławicka, Pogoń Lubstowska, Pogoń-Leśniczówka, Pogorzele, Półwiosek Lubstowski, Półwiosek Nowy, Półwiosek Stary, Rębowo, Różnowa, Różopole, Sarnowa, Sarnowa-Kolonia, Smolniki, Smolniki Polskie, Szyszyn, Szyszyn-Helenowo, Szyszyn-Pole, Szyszyn-Teodorowo, Szyszynek, Szyszyńskie Holendry, Tokary, Wąsosze, Wierzelin, Wygoda and Żółwiniec.

== Neighbouring gminas ==
Gmina Ślesin is bordered by the city of Konin and by the gminas of Kazimierz Biskupi, Kleczew, Kramsk, Skulsk, Sompolno, Wierzbinek and Wilczyn.
