= Brudzewo, Lubusz Voivodeship =

Brudzewo
- Village
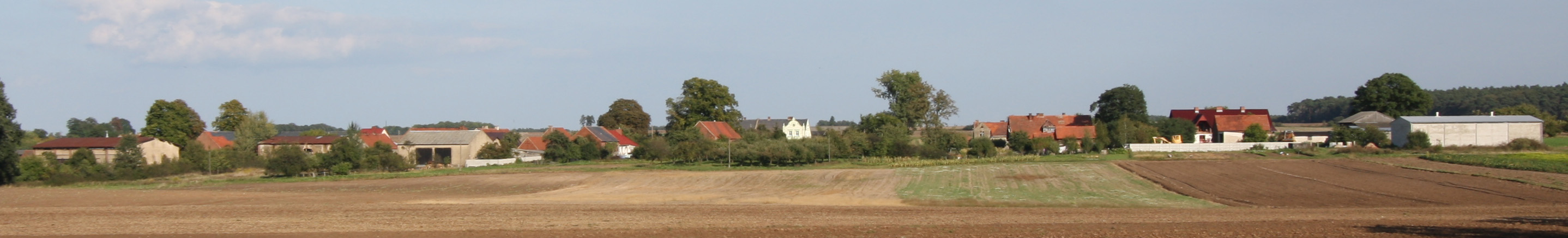

- Location within Poland
- Coordinates: 52°12′2″N 15°43′27″E
- Country: Poland
- Voivodeship: Lubusz
- County: Świebodzin
- Gmina: Szczaniec

Population
  - Total: 103

Brudzewo [bruˈd͡zɛvɔ] (German: Brausendorf) is a village in the administrative district of Gmina Szczaniec, within Świebodzin County, Lubusz Voivodeship, in western Poland.
