= Rębowo, Konin County =

Rębowo
- Village
- Location within Poland
- Coordinates: 52°20′01″N 18°14′06″E
- Country: Poland
- Voivodeship: Greater Poland
- County: Konin
- Gmina: Ślesin
- Population: 45

Rębowo [rɛmˈbɔvɔ] is a village in the administrative district of Gmina Ślesin, within Konin County, Greater Poland Voivodeship, in west-central Poland.
