= Konstantynowo, Konin County =

Konstantynowo
- Village
- Location within Poland
- Coordinates: 52°24′36″N 18°19′24″E
- Country: Poland
- Voivodeship: Greater Poland
- County: Konin
- Gmina: Ślesin
- Population: 82

Konstantynowo [kɔnstantɨˈnɔvɔ] is a village in the administrative district of Gmina Ślesin, within Konin County, Greater Poland Voivodeship, in west-central Poland.
