= Sarnowa-Kolonia =

- Village
- Location within Poland
- Coordinates: 52°22′58″N 18°16′34″E
- Country: Poland
- Voivodeship: Greater Poland
- County: Konin
- Gmina: Ślesin

Sarnowa-Kolonia [sarˈnɔva kɔˈlɔɲa] is a village in the administrative district of Gmina Ślesin, within Konin County, Greater Poland Voivodeship, in west-central Poland.
