= Koźminek, Lubusz Voivodeship =

Koźminek
- Village
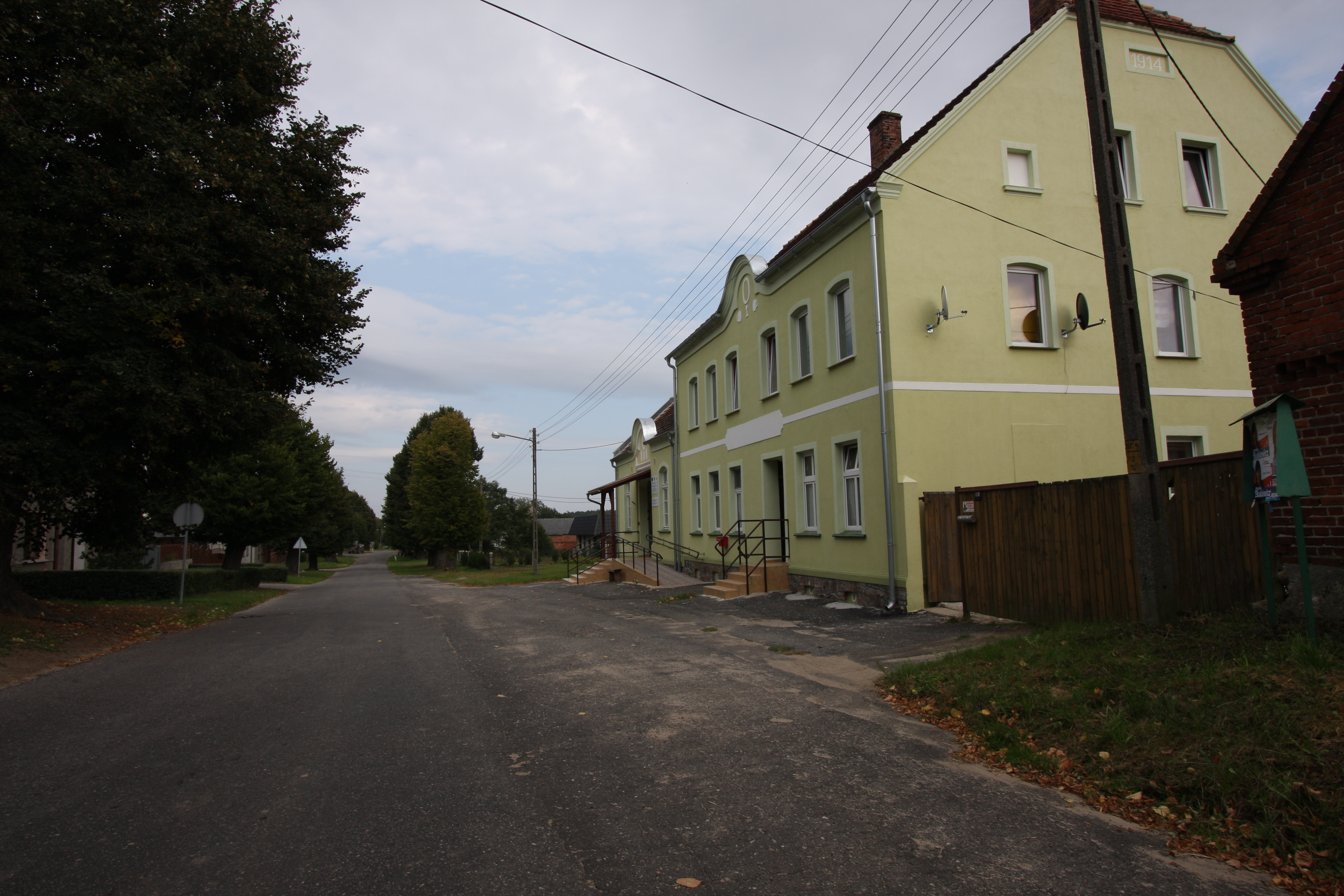

- Location within Poland
- Coordinates: 52°13′N 15°44′E
- Country: Poland
- Voivodeship: Lubusz
- County: Świebodzin
- Gmina: Szczaniec

Population
  - Total: 135
- Time zone: UTC+1 (CET)
  - Summer (DST): UTC+2 (CEST)
- Postal code: 66-225
- Vehicle registration: FSW

Koźminek [kɔʑˈminɛk] is a village in the administrative district of Gmina Szczaniec, within Świebodzin County, Lubusz Voivodeship, in western Poland.

Koźminek was a private church village, administratively located in the Poznań County in the Poznań Voivodeship in the Greater Poland Province of the Kingdom of Poland.
