= Pogorzele, Greater Poland Voivodeship =

Pogorzele
- Village
- Location within Poland
- Coordinates: 52°22′27″N 18°24′54″E
- Country: Poland
- Voivodeship: Greater Poland
- County: Konin
- Gmina: Ślesin
- Population: 133

Pogorzele [pɔɡɔˈʐɛlɛ] is a village in the administrative district of Gmina Ślesin, within Konin County, Greater Poland Voivodeship, in west-central Poland.
