= Canki =

- Village
- Location within Poland
- Coordinates: 53°56′47″N 21°34′35″E
- Country: Poland
- Voivodeship: Warmian-Masurian
- County: Giżycko
- Gmina: Ryn
- Population: 120

Canki [ˈt͡sanki] is a village in the administrative district of Gmina Ryn, within Giżycko County, Warmian-Masurian Voivodeship, in northern Poland.

Friedrich Baltrusch was born in the village in 1876.
