= Smardzewo, Lubusz Voivodeship =

Smardzewo
- Village
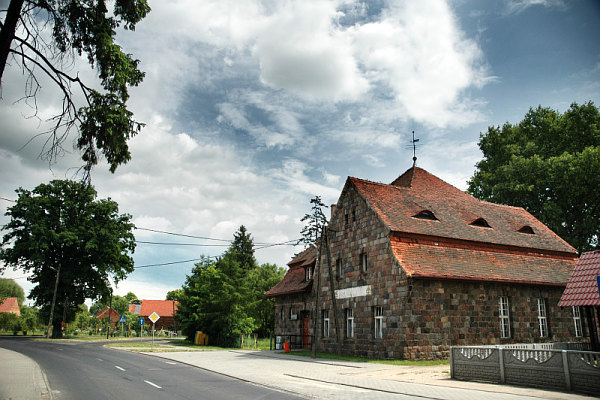

- Location within Poland
- Coordinates: 52°12′N 15°41′E
- Country: Poland
- Voivodeship: Lubusz
- County: Świebodzin
- Gmina: Szczaniec
- Population: 604

Smardzewo [smarˈd͡zɛvɔ] is a village in the administrative district of Gmina Szczaniec, within Świebodzin County, Lubusz Voivodeship, in western Poland.

== Notable residents ==
- Heinz Nowotnik (1920-1999), German SS officer
