= Tokary, Greater Poland Voivodeship =

Tokary
- Village
- Location within Poland
- Coordinates: 52°22′39″N 18°20′57″E
- Country: Poland
- Voivodeship: Greater Poland
- County: Konin
- Gmina: Ślesin
- Population: 28

Tokary [tɔˈkarɨ] is a village in the administrative district of Gmina Ślesin, within Konin County, Greater Poland Voivodeship, in west-central Poland.
