= Wąsosze, Greater Poland Voivodeship =

Wąsosze
- Village
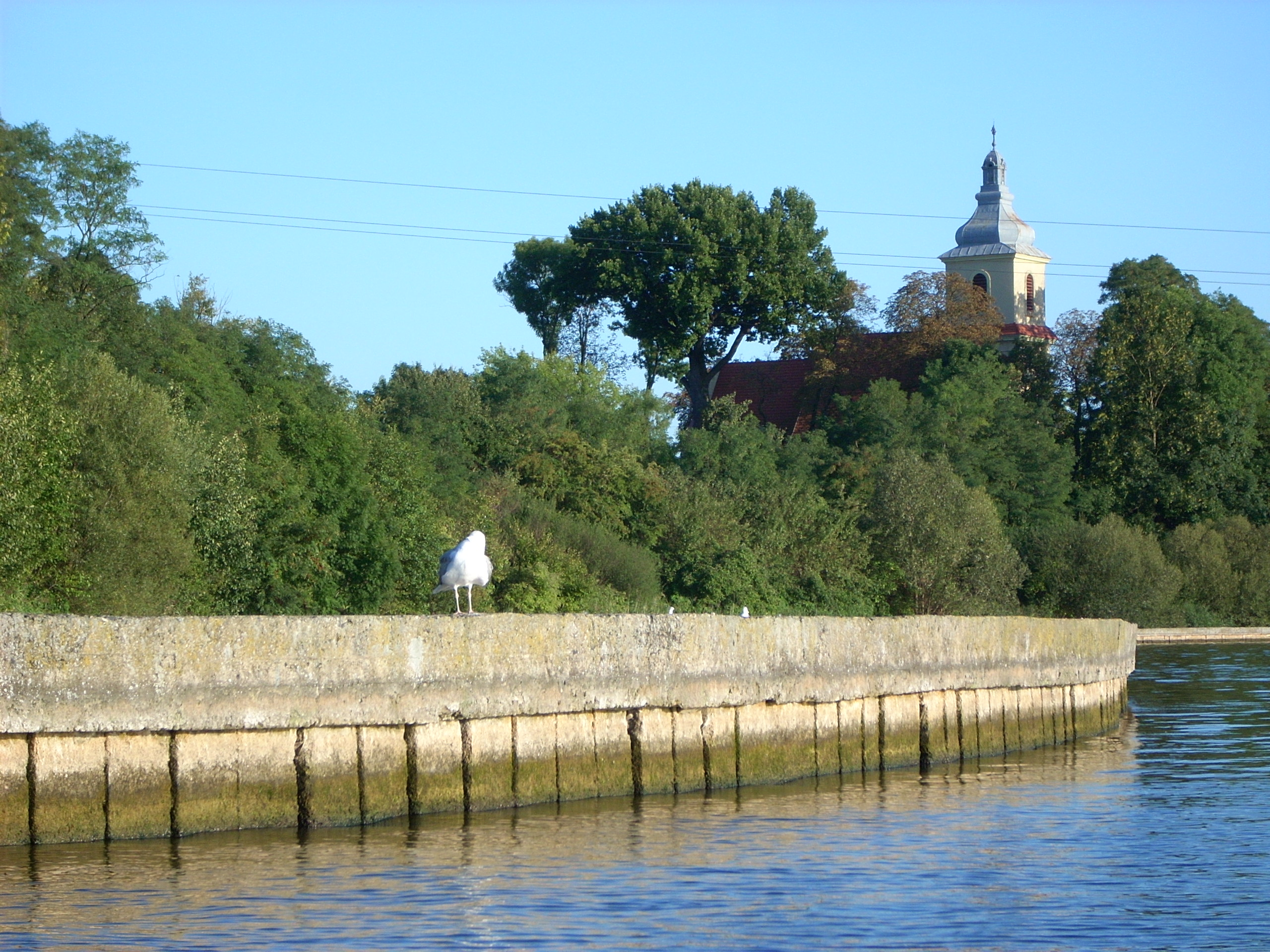

- Location within Poland
- Coordinates: 52°19′54″N 18°19′00″E
- Country: Poland
- Voivodeship: Greater Poland
- County: Konin
- Gmina: Ślesin

Wąsosze [vɔ̃ˈsɔʂɛ] is a village in the administrative district of Gmina Ślesin, within Konin County, Greater Poland Voivodeship, in west-central Poland.
