= Rzy =

- Village
- Location within Poland
- Coordinates: 52°42′N 20°34′E
- Country: Poland
- Voivodeship: Masovian
- County: Płońsk
- Gmina: Sochocin
- Population: 120

Rzy [rzɨ] is a village in the administrative district of Gmina Sochocin within Płońsk County, Masovian Voivodeship in east-central Poland.
