= Smardzewo, Płońsk County =

Village in Masovian Voivodeship, Poland

Smardzewo
- Village
- Location within Poland
- Coordinates: 52°42′N 20°24′E
- Country: Poland
- Voivodeship: Masovian
- County: Płońsk
- Gmina: Sochocin

Smardzewo [smarˈd͡zɛvɔ] is a village in the administrative district of Gmina Sochocin, within Płońsk County, Masovian Voivodeship, in east-central Poland.
