= Idzikowice, Masovian Voivodeship =

Idzikowice
- Village
- Location within Poland
- Coordinates: 52°39′N 20°32′E
- Country: Poland
- Voivodeship: Masovian
- County: Płońsk
- Gmina: Sochocin

Idzikowice [id͡ʑikɔˈvit͡sɛ] is a village in the administrative district of Gmina Sochocin, within Płońsk County, Masovian Voivodeship, in east-central Poland.
