= Żółwiniec, Gmina Ślesin =

Żółwiniec
- Village
- Location within Poland
- Coordinates: 52°24′N 18°20′E
- Country: Poland
- Voivodeship: Greater Poland
- County: Konin
- Gmina: Ślesin

Żółwiniec [ʐuu̯ˈviɲɛt͡s] is a village in the administrative district of Gmina Ślesin, within Konin County, Greater Poland Voivodeship, in west-central Poland.
