= Friedrich Baltrusch =

George Friedrich Baltrusch
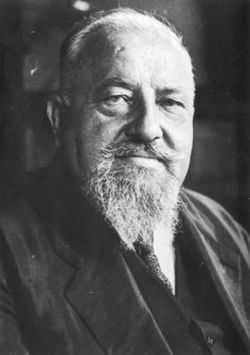
- Born: March 7, 1876; Waldhof, East Prussia, German Empire
- Died: April 22, 1949 (aged 73); Bad Wildungen, West Germany
- Occupations: Trade unionist, politician, soldier
- Years active: 1900–1949
- Political party: Zentrum Party; Christian Democratic Union
- Other political affiliations: Young German Order
- Spouse: Anna Friederike Husemann (1876–1943)
- Children: 6

Georg Friedrich Baltrusch (March 7, 1876, in Waldhof, East Prussia (German Empire) – April 22, 1949, in Bad Wildungen, West Germany), was a German military officer and a politician in the German Democratic Party/CDU. One of the leaders of the Jungdeutscher Orden, he had a place in the German Parliament between 1930 and 1933. After World War II, he was one of the founders of CDU.

== Career ==
Baltrusch joined a Christian Woodworkers' Union in Essen in 1900, and from 1907 he worked as a full-time union secretary in the Christian trade union movement. After serving in the First World War he became the managing director of the national association in 1919 and its representative to the Weimar government and other important bodies in Berlin. He was a close associate of Adam Stegerwald and the German government often relied on him as an expert on both economic policy and social policy.

During this time he served as a board member on the Reich Food Office and worked for the Reich Ministry of Reconstruction. In the 1930 election Baltrusch was elected as an MP for the Zentrum Party and was the most important protestant representative of the trade unions, he lost his seat after the nazi seizure of power in 1933.

After World War II, he was one of the founders of CDU.

== Personal life ==
On November 4, 1899, he married Anna Friederike Husemann (1876–1943), they had 6 children.
