= Sarnowa, Konin County =

Sarnowa
- Village
- Location within Poland
- Coordinates: 52°22′56″N 18°16′31″E
- Country: Poland
- Voivodeship: Greater Poland
- County: Konin
- Gmina: Ślesin
- Population: 24

Sarnowa [sarˈnɔva] is a village in the administrative district of Gmina Ślesin, within Konin County, Greater Poland Voivodeship, in west-central Poland.
