= Zaryn =

Zaryn may refer to:

- Zaryń, Polish village
- Żaryn, Polish surname
- Zaryn Dentzel, founder of Tuenti Technologies
- Zaryn Min (Zarynn Min) (born 1980), Malaysian actress
