= Teodorowo =

Teodorowo may refer to the following places:

- Teodorowo, Lipno County in Kuyavian-Pomeranian Voivodeship (north-central Poland)
- Teodorowo, Radziejów County in Kuyavian-Pomeranian Voivodeship (north-central Poland)
- Teodorowo, Ostrołęka County in Masovian Voivodeship (east-central Poland)
- Teodorowo, Płock County in Masovian Voivodeship (east-central Poland)
- Teodorowo, Greater Poland Voivodeship (west-central Poland)
