= Słomkowo =

Słomkowo may refer to the following places:

- Słomkowo, Greater Poland Voivodeship (west-central Poland)
- Słomkowo, Kuyavian-Pomeranian Voivodeship (north-central Poland)
- Słomkowo, Masovian Voivodeship (east-central Poland)
