= Gmina Staroźreby =

Gmina Staroźreby Staroźreby Commune
- Gmina
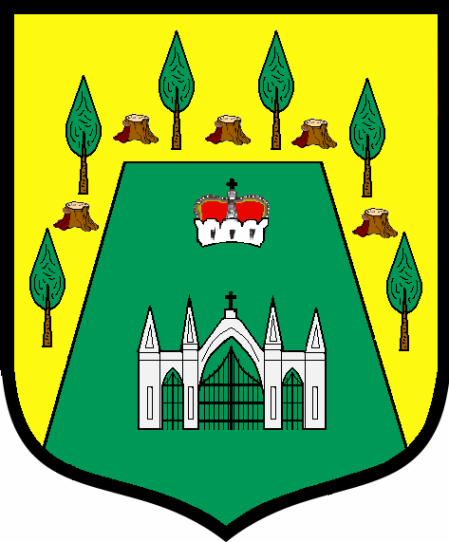
- Coat of arms
- Interactive map of Gmina Staroźreby
- Coordinates (Staroźreby): 52°38′N 19°59′E
- Country: Poland
- Voivodeship: Masovian
- County: Płock County
- Seat: Staroźreby

Area
  - Total: 137.55 km^{2} (53.11 sq mi)

Population (2006)
  - Total: 7,576
  - Density: 55.08/km^{2} (142.7/sq mi)
- Time zone: UTC+1 (CET)
  - Summer (DST): UTC+2 (CEST)
- Vehicle registration: WPL

Gmina Staroźreby is an urban-rural gmina (administrative district) in Płock County, Masovian Voivodeship, in central Poland. Its seat is the town of Staroźreby, which lies approximately 22 kilometres (14 mi) north-east of Płock and 84 km (52 mi) north-west of Warsaw.

Areas of the administrative district are situated on the area of Masovia-Podlaskie land in the river basin of Wkra and the Vistula rivers. In the landscape flatlands are dominating and lightly wavy. They are reweighing pine, alder and birchen forests. In the local river basin Płonka a natural-landscape fall-rope is found, on the land which is building one's nests great crested grebe protected.

The gmina covers an area of 137.55 square kilometres (53.1 sq mi), and as of 2006 its total population is 7,576.

== Villages ==
Gmina Staroźreby contains the town of Staroźreby, and the villages and settlements of Aleksandrowo, Begno, Bromierz, Bromierzyk, Brudzyno, Bylino, Dąbrusk, Dłużniewo Duże, Falęcin, Góra, Goszczyno, Karwowo-Podgórne, Kierz, Krzywanice, Krzywanice-Trojany, Marychnów, Mieczyno, Mikołajewo, Mrówczewo, Nowa Góra, Nowa Wieś, Nowe Staroźreby, Nowe Żochowo, Nowy Bromierz, Nowy Bromierzyk, Opatówiec, Ostrzykówek, Piączyn, Płonna, Przeciszewo, Przeciszewo-Kolonia, Przedbórz, Przedpełce, Rogowo, Rostkowo, Rostkowo-Orszymowice, Sarzyn, Sędek, Słomkowo, Smardzewo, Staroźreby-Hektary, Stoplin, Strzeszewo, Szulbory, Teodorowo, Worowice-Wyroby, Zdziar Mały, Zdziar Wielki, Zdziar-Las and Żochowo Stare.

== Neighbouring gminas ==
Gmina Staroźreby is bordered by the gminas of Baboszewo, Bielsk, Bulkowo, Drobin, Dzierzążnia, Raciąż and Radzanowo.
