= Ziemięcin =

Ziemięcin may refer to the following places:

- Ziemięcin, Greater Poland Voivodeship (west-central Poland)
- Ziemięcin, Łódź Voivodeship (central Poland)
- Ziemięcin, Masovian Voivodeship (east-central Poland)
