= Katarzynowo =

Katarzynowo may refer to the following places:

- Katarzynowo, Konin County in Greater Poland Voivodeship (west-central Poland)
- Katarzynowo, Rawicz County in Greater Poland Voivodeship (west-central Poland)
- Katarzynowo, Słupca County in Greater Poland Voivodeship (west-central Poland)
- Katarzynowo, Warmian-Masurian Voivodeship (north Poland)
