= Nowa Ruda (disambiguation) =

Nowa Ruda may refer to the following places:

- Nowa Ruda, Lower Silesian Voivodeship (south-west Poland)
- Nowa Ruda, Lublin Voivodeship (east Poland)
- Nowa Ruda, Podlaskie Voivodeship (north-east Poland)
- Nowa Ruda, Greater Poland Voivodeship (west-central Poland)
