= Leszczyc =

Leszczyc may refer to:

- Leszczyc, Greater Poland Voivodeship, a village in Poland
- Leszczyc coat of arms, a Polish coat of arms
- Andrzej Leszczyc, a fictional character created by Jerzy Skolimowski
- Michał Hieronim Leszczyc-Sumiński (1820–1898), Polish botanist and painter
