= Kazimierzewo =

Kazimierzewo may refer to the following places:

- Kazimierzewo, Greater Poland Voivodeship (west-central Poland)
- Kazimierzewo, Nakło County in Kuyavian-Pomeranian Voivodeship (north-central Poland)
- Kazimierzewo, Toruń County in Kuyavian-Pomeranian Voivodeship (north-central Poland)
- Kazimierzewo, Warmian-Masurian Voivodeship (north Poland)
