= Żurawianka =

Location
- Country: Poland

Physical characteristics
- Mouth
  - location: Płonka
  - coordinates: 52.6270°N 20.3407°E

Basin features
- Progression: Płonka→ Wkra→ Narew→ Vistula→ Baltic Sea

Żurawianka is a river of Poland, a tributary of the Płonka in Płońsk.
