= Kazimierowo =

Kazimierowo may refer to the following places:

- Kazimierowo, Greater Poland Voivodeship (west-central Poland)
- Kazimierowo, Kuyavian-Pomeranian Voivodeship (north-central Poland)
- Kazimierowo, Podlaskie Voivodeship (north-east Poland)
