= Płonna =

Płonna may refer to the following places in Poland:

- Płonna, Podkarpackie Voivodeship (south-east Poland)
- Płonna, Masovian Voivodeship (east-central Poland)
