= Nykiel (surname) =

Nykiel is a surname. Notable people with the surname include:

- Julie Nykiel (born 1958), Australian women's basketball player
- Krzysztof Nykiel (born 1982), Polish professional footballer
- Krzysztof Józef Nykiel (born 1965), Polish Roman Catholic priest and the regent of the Apostolic Penitentiary
- Natalia Nykiel (born 1995), Polish singer and songwriter

See also

- Nykiel, is a village in the administrative district of Gmina Wierzbinek, within Konin County, Greater Poland Voivodeship, in west-central Poland
