= Dziadoch =

Dziadoch Dzadiak
- Village
- Dziadoch
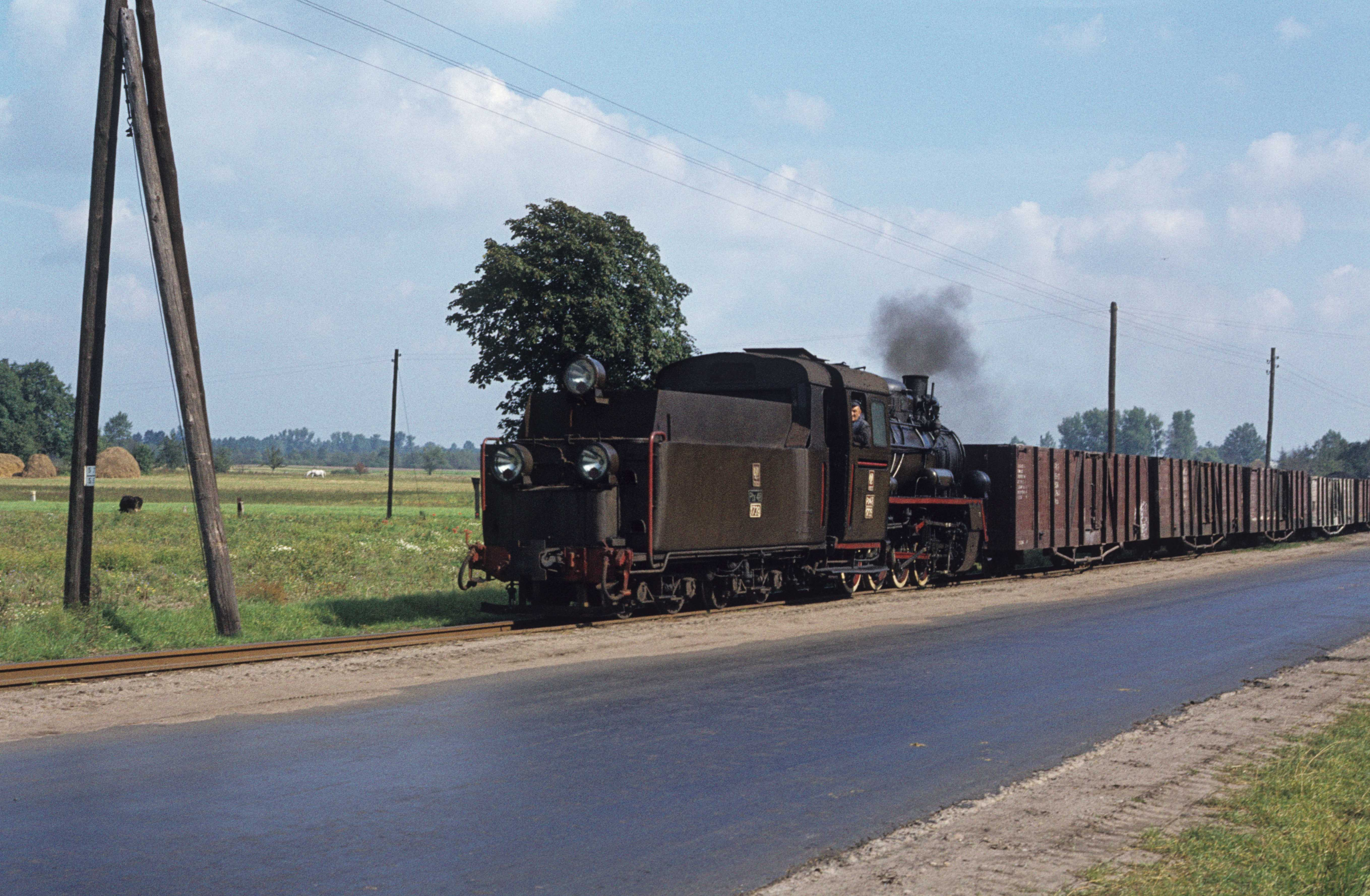
- A train passing through Dziadoch.
- Interactive map of Dziadoch
- Location within Poland
- Coordinates: 52°23′34″N 18°28′22″E
- Country: Poland
- Voivodeship: Greater Poland
- County: Konin
- Gmina: Wierzbinek
- Time zone: UTC+1 (Central European Time)
  - Summer (DST): UTC+2 (Central European Summer Time)
- Postal Code: 62-619
- ISO 3166 code: .pl

Dziadoch [ˈd͡ʑadɔx] is a village in the administrative district of Gmina Wierzbinek, within Konin County, Greater Poland Voivodeship, in west-central Poland.

== History ==
From 1975 until 1998 the town administratively belonged to the Konin Voivodeship.

The village was under the Teresewo village and was formerly named Dziadak until December 31, 2016.
