= Dzierzążnica =

Location
- Country: Poland

Physical characteristics
- Mouth
  - location: Płonka
  - coordinates: 52.6310°N 20.2578°E

Basin features
- Progression: Płonka→ Wkra→ Narew→ Vistula→ Baltic Sea

Dzierzążnica is a river of Poland, a tributary of the Płonka near Dzierzążnia.
