= Sadlno =

Sadlno may refer to the following places in Poland:

- Sadlno, Lower Silesian Voivodeship (south-west Poland)
- Sadlno, Greater Poland Voivodeship (west-central Poland)
- Sadlno, West Pomeranian Voivodeship (north-west Poland)
