= Julianowo =

Julianowo may refer to the following places:

- Julianowo, Greater Poland Voivodeship (west-central Poland)
- Julianowo, Kuyavian-Pomeranian Voivodeship (north-central Poland)
- Julianowo, Masovian Voivodeship (east-central Poland)
- Julianowo, Pomeranian Voivodeship (north Poland)
- Julianowo, Warmian-Masurian Voivodeship (north Poland)
