= Pamiątka, Greater Poland Voivodeship =

Pamiątka
- Village
- Location within Poland
- Coordinates: 52°27′19″N 18°34′53″E
- Country: Poland
- Voivodeship: Greater Poland
- County: Konin
- Gmina: Wierzbinek

Pamiątka [paˈmjɔntka] is a village in the administrative district of Gmina Wierzbinek, within Konin County, Greater Poland Voivodeship, in west-central Poland.
