= Wierzbinek =

- Village
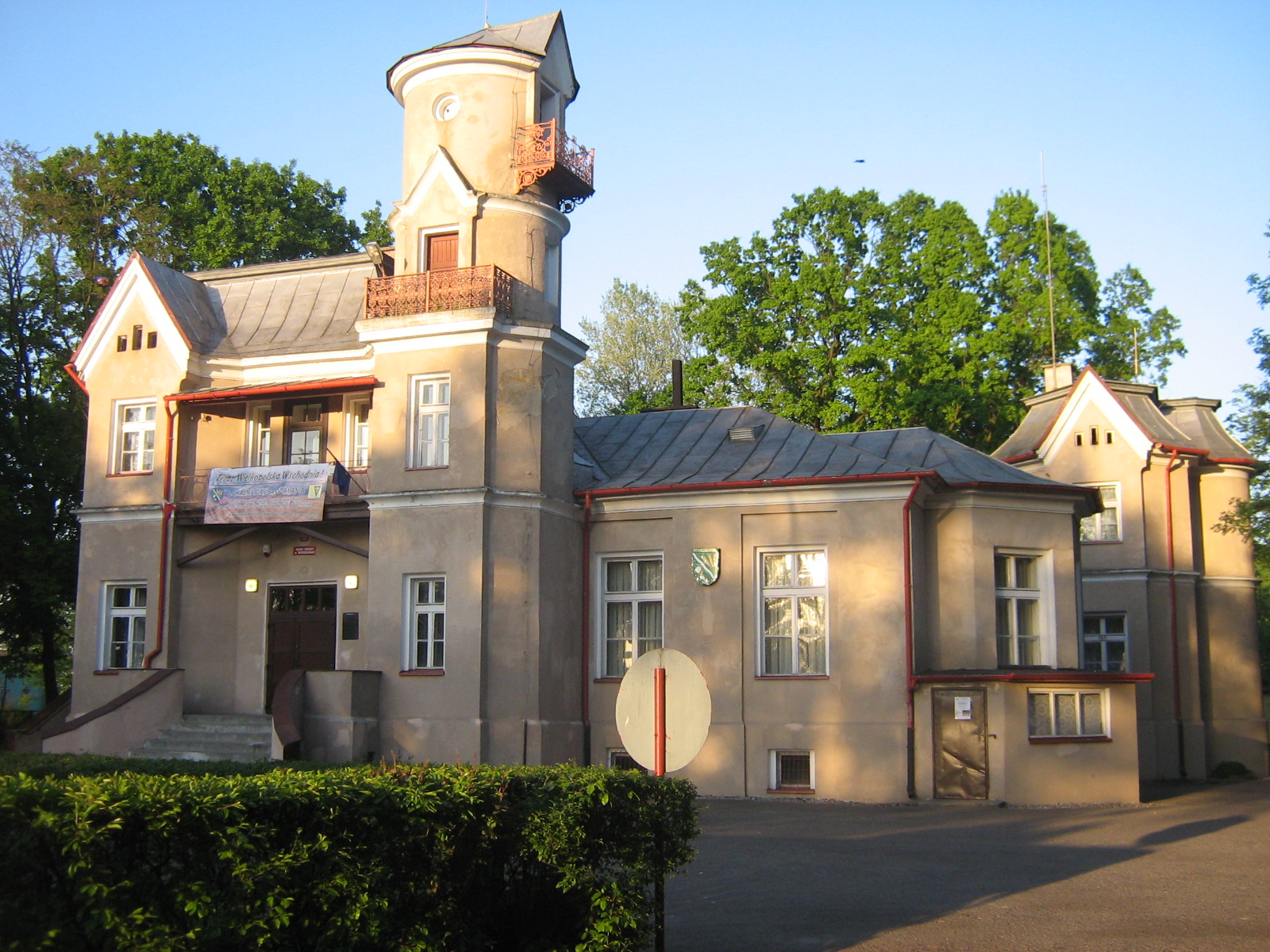
- Manor

- Location within Poland
- Coordinates: 52°26′N 18°31′E
- Country: Poland
- Voivodeship: Greater Poland
- County: Konin
- Gmina: Wierzbinek
- Population: 380

Wierzbinek [vjɛʐˈbinɛk] is a village in Konin County, Greater Poland Voivodeship, in west-central Poland. It is the seat of the gmina (administrative district) called Gmina Wierzbinek.
