= Ruszkowo-Parcel =

- Village
- Location within Poland
- Coordinates: 52°25′34″N 18°25′44″E
- Country: Poland
- Voivodeship: Greater Poland
- County: Konin
- Gmina: Wierzbinek
- Population: 270

Ruszkowo-Parcel [ruʂˈkɔvɔ ˈpart͡sɛl] is a village in the administrative district of Gmina Wierzbinek, within Konin County, Greater Poland Voivodeship, in west-central Poland.
