= Nockie Holendry =

- Village
- Location within Poland
- Coordinates: 52°25′02″N 18°23′50″E
- Country: Poland
- Voivodeship: Greater Poland
- County: Konin
- Gmina: Wierzbinek

Nockie Holendry [ˈnɔt͡skʲɛ xɔˈlɛndrɨ] is a village in the administrative district of Gmina Wierzbinek, within Konin County, Greater Poland Voivodeship, in west-central Poland.
