= Posada, Gmina Wierzbinek =

Posada
- Village
- Location within Poland
- Coordinates: 52°26′57″N 18°34′10″E
- Country: Poland
- Voivodeship: Greater Poland
- County: Konin
- Gmina: Wierzbinek

Posada [pɔˈsada] is a village in the administrative district of Gmina Wierzbinek, within Konin County, Greater Poland Voivodeship, in west-central Poland.
