= Wójcinek =

- Village
- Location within Poland
- Coordinates: 52°26′27″N 18°24′49″E
- Country: Poland
- Voivodeship: Greater Poland
- County: Konin
- Gmina: Wierzbinek

Wójcinek [vui̯ˈt͡ɕinɛk] is a village in the administrative district of Gmina Wierzbinek, within Konin County, Greater Poland Voivodeship, in west-central Poland.
