= Tomaszewo, Konin County =

Tomaszewo
- Village
- Location within Poland
- Coordinates: 52°29′58″N 18°30′58″E
- Country: Poland
- Voivodeship: Greater Poland
- County: Konin
- Gmina: Wierzbinek
- Population: 110

Tomaszewo [tɔmaˈʂɛvɔ] is a village in the administrative district of Gmina Wierzbinek, within Konin County, Greater Poland Voivodeship, in west-central Poland.
