= Ruszkówek =

- Village
- Location within Poland
- Coordinates: 52°25′04″N 18°26′05″E
- Country: Poland
- Voivodeship: Greater Poland
- County: Konin
- Gmina: Wierzbinek

Ruszkówek [ruʂˈkuvɛk] is a village in the administrative district of Gmina Wierzbinek, within Konin County, Greater Poland Voivodeship, in west-central Poland.
