= Dębowiec, Konin County =

Dębowiec
- Village
- Location within Poland
- Coordinates: 52°27′00″N 18°38′29″E
- Country: Poland
- Voivodeship: Greater Poland
- County: Konin
- Gmina: Wierzbinek

Dębowiec [dɛmˈbɔvjɛt͡s] is a village in the administrative district of Gmina Wierzbinek, within Konin County, Greater Poland Voivodeship, in west-central Poland.
