= Begno, Płock County =

Begno
- Village
- Location within Poland
- Coordinates: 52°36′43″N 20°3′25″E
- Country: Poland
- Voivodeship: Masovian
- County: Płock
- Gmina: Staroźreby
- Population (2021): 91
- Time zone: UTC+1 (CET)
  - Summer (DST): UTC+2 (CEST)
- Vehicle registration: WPL

Begno [ˈbɛɡnɔ] is a village in the administrative district of Gmina Staroźreby, within Płock County, Masovian Voivodeship, in central Poland. In 2021, the total population of the village was 91.
