= Synogać =

- Village
- Location within Poland
- Coordinates: 52°25′N 18°32′E
- Country: Poland
- Voivodeship: Greater Poland
- County: Konin
- Gmina: Wierzbinek

Synogać [sɨˈnɔɡat͡ɕ] is a village in the administrative district of Gmina Wierzbinek, within Konin County, Greater Poland Voivodeship, in west-central Poland.
