= Wojciechowo, Gmina Wierzbinek =

Wojciechowo
- Village
- Location within Poland
- Coordinates: 52°27′17″N 18°28′26″E
- Country: Poland
- Voivodeship: Greater Poland
- County: Konin
- Gmina: Wierzbinek

Wojciechowo (Polish pronunciation: [vɔjt͡ɕɛˈxɔvɔ]) is a village in the administrative district of Gmina Wierzbinek, within Konin County, Greater Poland Voivodeship, in west-central Poland.
