= Chrząszczewo, Greater Poland Voivodeship =

Chrząszczewo
- Village
- Location within Poland
- Coordinates: 52°25′14″N 18°30′19″E
- Country: Poland
- Voivodeship: Greater Poland
- County: Konin
- Gmina: Wierzbinek

Chrząszczewo [xʂɔ̃ʂˈt͡ʂɛvɔ] is a village in the administrative district of Gmina Wierzbinek, within Konin County, Greater Poland Voivodeship, in west-central Poland.
