= Gmina Wierzbinek =

Gmina Wierzbinek Wierzbinek Commune
- Gmina
- Flag Coat of arms

- Coordinates (Wierzbinek): 52°26′N 18°31′E
- Country: Poland
- Voivodeship: Greater Poland
- County: Konin County
- Seat: Wierzbinek

Area
  - Total: 148.05 km^{2} (57.16 sq mi)

Population (2006)
  - Total: 7,597
  - Density: 51.31/km^{2} (132.9/sq mi)
- Website: http://www.wierzbinek.pl

Gmina Wierzbinek is a rural gmina (administrative district) in Konin County, Greater Poland Voivodeship, in west-central Poland. Its seat is the village of Wierzbinek, which lies approximately 30 kilometres (19 mi) north-east of Konin and 109 km (68 mi) east of the regional capital Poznań.

The gmina covers an area of 148.05 square kilometres (57.2 sq mi), and as of 2006 its total population is 7,597.

== Villages ==
Gmina Wierzbinek contains the villages and settlements of:

- Boguszyce
- Boguszyczki
- Broniszewo
- Cegielnia-Rudki
- Chlebowo
- Chrząszczewo
- Ciepłowo
- Dębowiec
- Dobra Wola
- Dziadoch
- Florianowo
- Gaj
- Galczyce
- Galczyczki
- Goczki Polskie
- Helenowo
- Janinów
- Janowice
- Janowo Racięckie
- Julianowo
- Kalina
- Katarzynowo
- Kazimierowo
- Kazimierzewo
- Kazubek
- Kolonia Racięcka
- Kryszkowice
- Krzymowo
- Kwiatkowo
- Leszczyc
- Łysek
- Łysek-Sosnówka
- Majdany
- Mąkoszyn
- Mielno
- Morzyczyn
- Noć
- Nockie Holendry
- Nowa Ruda
- Nowiny Kryszkowskie
- Nykiel
- Obory
- Ostrówek
- Ostrowo
- Pagórki
- Palmowo
- Pamiątka
- Paradowo
- Posada
- Racięcin
- Romanowo
- Ruszkówek
- Ruszkowo-Parcel
- Rybno
- Sadlno
- Słomkowo
- Stanisławowo
- Stara Ruda
- Stefanowo Racięckie
- Straszewo
- Sumin
- Suskowo
- Synogać
- Talarkowo
- Teodorowo
- Teresewo
- Tomaszewo
- Tomisławice
- Walerianowo
- Wandzinowo
- Wierzbinek
- Wilcza Kłoda
- Witkowice
- Władysławowo
- Wojciechowo
- Wójcinek
- Zaborowo
- Zakrzewek
- Zamość
- Zaryń
- Zielonka
- Ziemięcin
- Złotowo
- Żółwiniec
- Żychlinek

== Neighbouring gminas ==
Gmina Wierzbinek is bordered by the gminas of Babiak, Piotrków Kujawski, Skulsk, Ślesin, Sompolno and Topólka.
