= Łydynia =

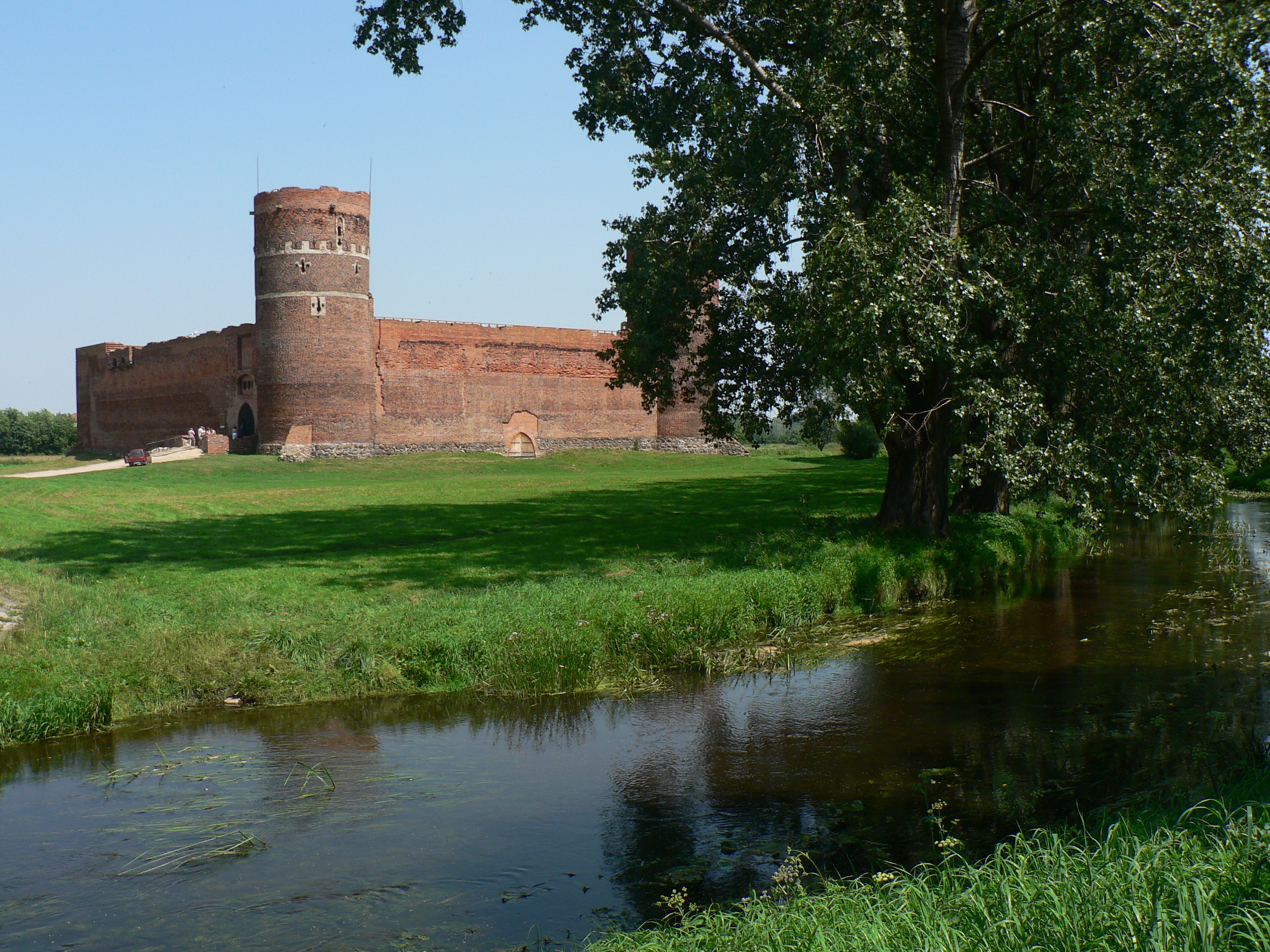
- Ciechanów Castle, beside the Łydynia

Location
- Country: Poland

Physical characteristics
- Mouth
  - location: Wkra
  - coordinates: 52°42′24″N 20°26′41″E
- Length: 72 km (45 mi)

Basin features
- Progression: Wkra→ Narew→ Vistula→ Baltic Sea

Łydynia is a river of north-eastern central Poland, a left tributary of the Wkra at the town of Sochocin, with an overall length of 72 kilometers.

The river flows past Ciechanów and its ancient Mazovian ducal castle. Its own tributaries include the Giedniówka, the Dunajczyk, the Stawnica, and the Pławnica.
