= Morzyczyn, Greater Poland Voivodeship =

Morzyczyn
- Village
- Location within Poland
- Coordinates: 52°25′34″N 18°24′11″E
- Country: Poland
- Voivodeship: Greater Poland
- County: Konin
- Gmina: Wierzbinek
- Population: 270

Morzyczyn [mɔˈʐɨt͡ʂɨn] is a village in the administrative district of Gmina Wierzbinek, within Konin County, Greater Poland Voivodeship, in west-central Poland.
