= Cegielnia-Rudki =

- Village
- Location within Poland
- Coordinates: 52°25′57″N 18°25′26″E
- Country: Poland
- Voivodeship: Greater Poland
- County: Konin
- Gmina: Wierzbinek

Cegielnia-Rudki [t͡sɛˈɡʲɛlɲa ˈrutki] is a village in the administrative district of Gmina Wierzbinek, within Konin County, Greater Poland Voivodeship, in west-central Poland.
