= Janowo Racięckie =

- Village
- Location within Poland
- Coordinates: 52°28′38″N 18°26′24″E
- Country: Poland
- Voivodeship: Greater Poland
- County: Konin
- Gmina: Wierzbinek

Janowo Racięckie [jaˈnɔvɔ raˈt͡ɕɛnt͡skʲɛ] is a village in the administrative district of Gmina Wierzbinek, within Konin County, Greater Poland Voivodeship, in west-central Poland.
