= Walerianowo, Konin County =

Walerianowo
- Village
- Location within Poland
- Coordinates: 52°29′37″N 18°29′2″E
- Country: Poland
- Voivodeship: Greater Poland
- County: Konin
- Gmina: Wierzbinek
- Population: 100

Walerianowo [valɛrjaˈnɔvɔ] (formerly Halogramy) is a village in the administrative district of Gmina Wierzbinek, within Konin County, Greater Poland Voivodeship, in west-central Poland.
