= Wilcza Kłoda =

- Village
- Location within Poland
- Coordinates: 52°24′27″N 18°25′36″E
- Country: Poland
- Voivodeship: Greater Poland
- County: Konin
- Gmina: Wierzbinek

Wilcza Kłoda [ˈvilt͡ʂa ˈkwɔda] is a village in the administrative district of Gmina Wierzbinek, within Konin County, Greater Poland Voivodeship, in west-central Poland.
