= Broniszewo, Konin County =

Broniszewo
- Village
- Location within Poland
- Coordinates: 52°28′N 18°24′E
- Country: Poland
- Voivodeship: Greater Poland
- County: Konin
- Gmina: Wierzbinek

Broniszewo [brɔniˈʂɛvɔ] is a village in the administrative district of Gmina Wierzbinek, within Konin County, Greater Poland Voivodeship, in west-central Poland.
