= Helenowo, Gmina Wierzbinek =

Helenowo
- Village
- Location within Poland
- Coordinates: 52°26′29″N 18°26′42″E
- Country: Poland
- Voivodeship: Greater Poland
- County: Konin
- Gmina: Wierzbinek

Helenowo [xɛlɛˈnɔvɔ] is a village in the administrative district of Gmina Wierzbinek, within Konin County, Greater Poland Voivodeship, in west-central Poland.
