= Przeciszewo-Kolonia =

- Village
- Location within Poland
- Coordinates: 52°40′12″N 19°57′27″E
- Country: Poland
- Voivodeship: Masovian
- County: Płock
- Gmina: Staroźreby
- Time zone: UTC+1 (CET)
  - Summer (DST): UTC+2 (CEST)
- Vehicle registration: WPL

Przeciszewo-Kolonia [pʂɛt͡ɕiˈʂɛvɔ kɔˈlɔɲa] is a village in the administrative district of Gmina Staroźreby, within Płock County, Masovian Voivodeship, in central Poland.
