= Ostrowo, Konin County =

Ostrowo
- Village
- Location within Poland
- Coordinates: 52°27′33″N 18°32′10″E
- Country: Poland
- Voivodeship: Greater Poland
- County: Konin
- Gmina: Wierzbinek

Ostrowo [ɔsˈtrɔvɔ] is a village in the administrative district of Gmina Wierzbinek, within Konin County, Greater Poland Voivodeship, in west-central Poland.
