= Żochowo Stare =

- Village
- Location within Poland
- Coordinates: 52°38′05″N 20°05′56″E
- Country: Poland
- Voivodeship: Masovian
- County: Płock
- Gmina: Staroźreby
- Time zone: UTC+1 (CET)
  - Summer (DST): UTC+2 (CEST)
- Vehicle registration: WPL

Żochowo Stare [ʐɔˈxɔvɔ ˈstarɛ] is a village in the administrative district of Gmina Staroźreby, within Płock County, Masovian Voivodeship, in central Poland.

== Demography ==
According to the National Population and Housing Census of 2011, the population in the village of Żochowo Stare is 93, of which 48 are women, and 45 are male.

Demographic structure as of March 31, 2011

| Gender | General | Pre-working | Working | Post working |
|---|---|---|---|---|
| Men | 45 | 15 | 29 | 1 |
| Women | 48 | 7 | 32 | 9 |
| Together | 93 | 22 | 61 | 10 |
