= Mąkoszyn, Greater Poland Voivodeship =

Mąkoszyn
- Village
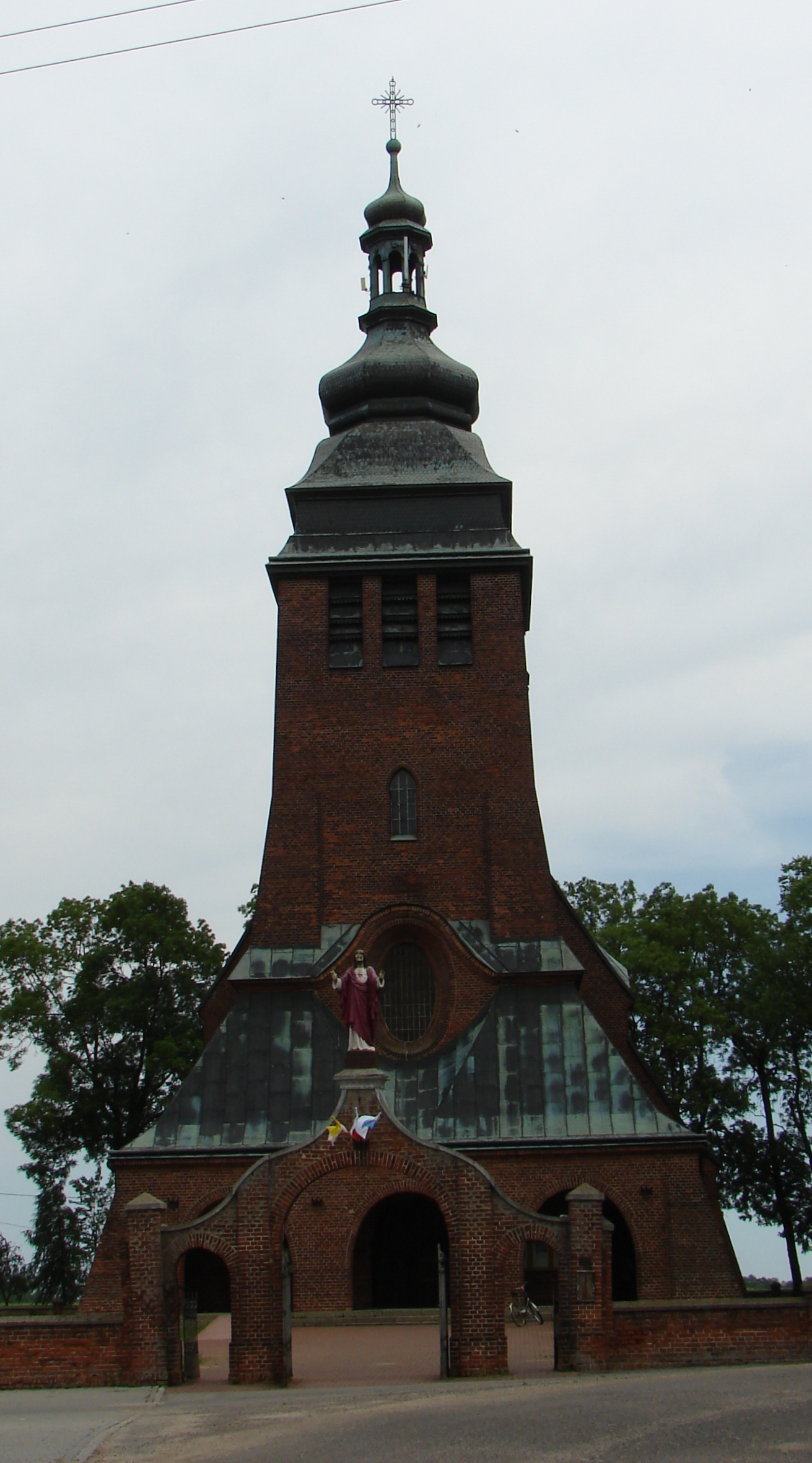
- Parish church, built 1916–1918.

- Location within Poland
- Coordinates: 52°26′0″N 18°38′10″E
- Country: Poland
- Voivodeship: Greater Poland
- County: Konin
- Gmina: Wierzbinek

Mąkoszyn [mɔnˈkɔʂɨn] is a village in the administrative district of Gmina Wierzbinek, within Konin County, Greater Poland Voivodeship, in west-central Poland.
