= Góra, Płock County =

Góra
- Village
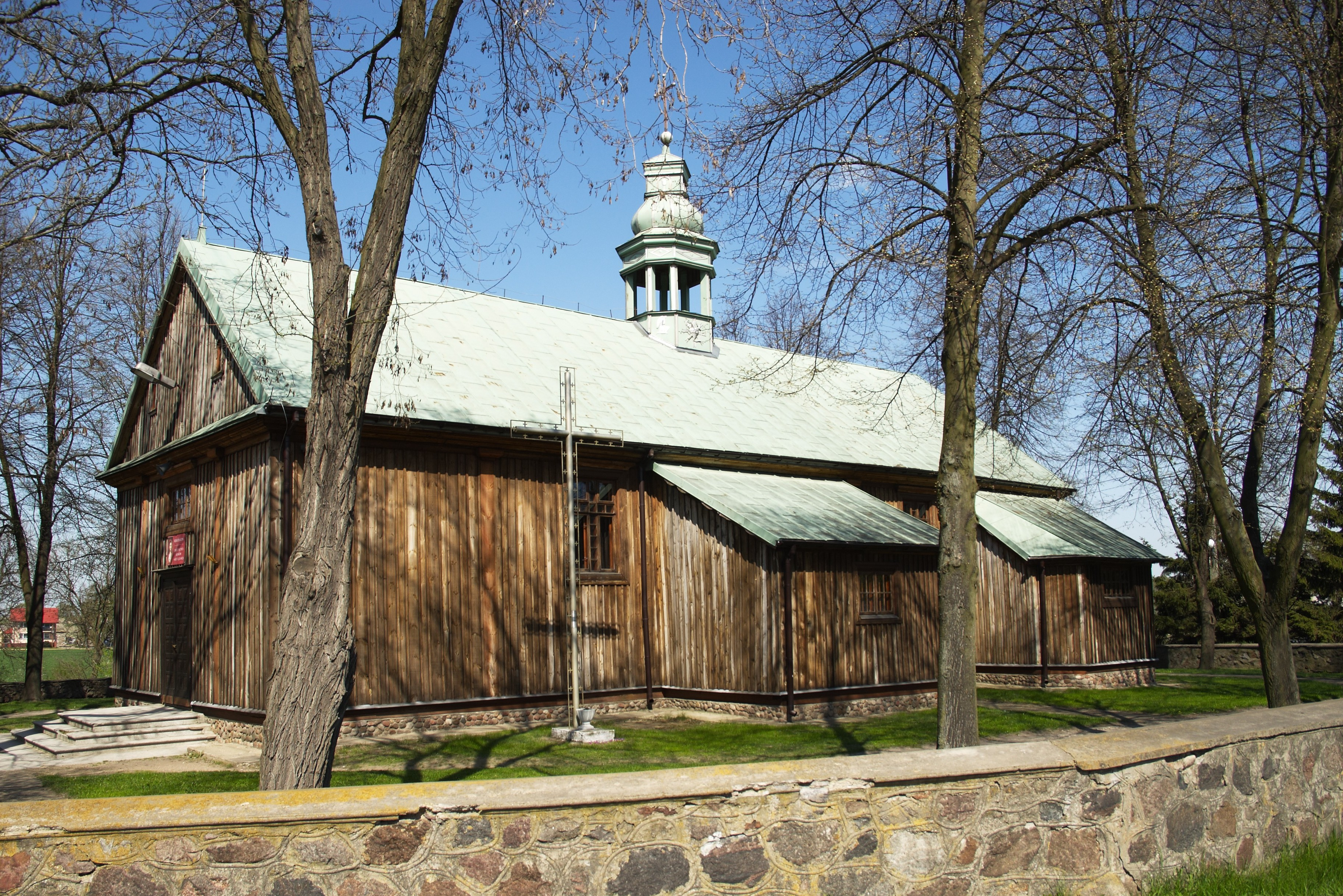
- Saint James the Greater church in Góra

- Location within Poland
- Coordinates: 52°39′N 20°6′E
- Country: Poland
- Voivodeship: Masovian
- County: Płock
- Gmina: Staroźreby
- Time zone: UTC+1 (CET)
  - Summer (DST): UTC+2 (CEST)

Góra [ˈɡura] is a village in the administrative district of Gmina Staroźreby, within Płock County, Masovian Voivodeship, in central Poland.
