= Płonka =

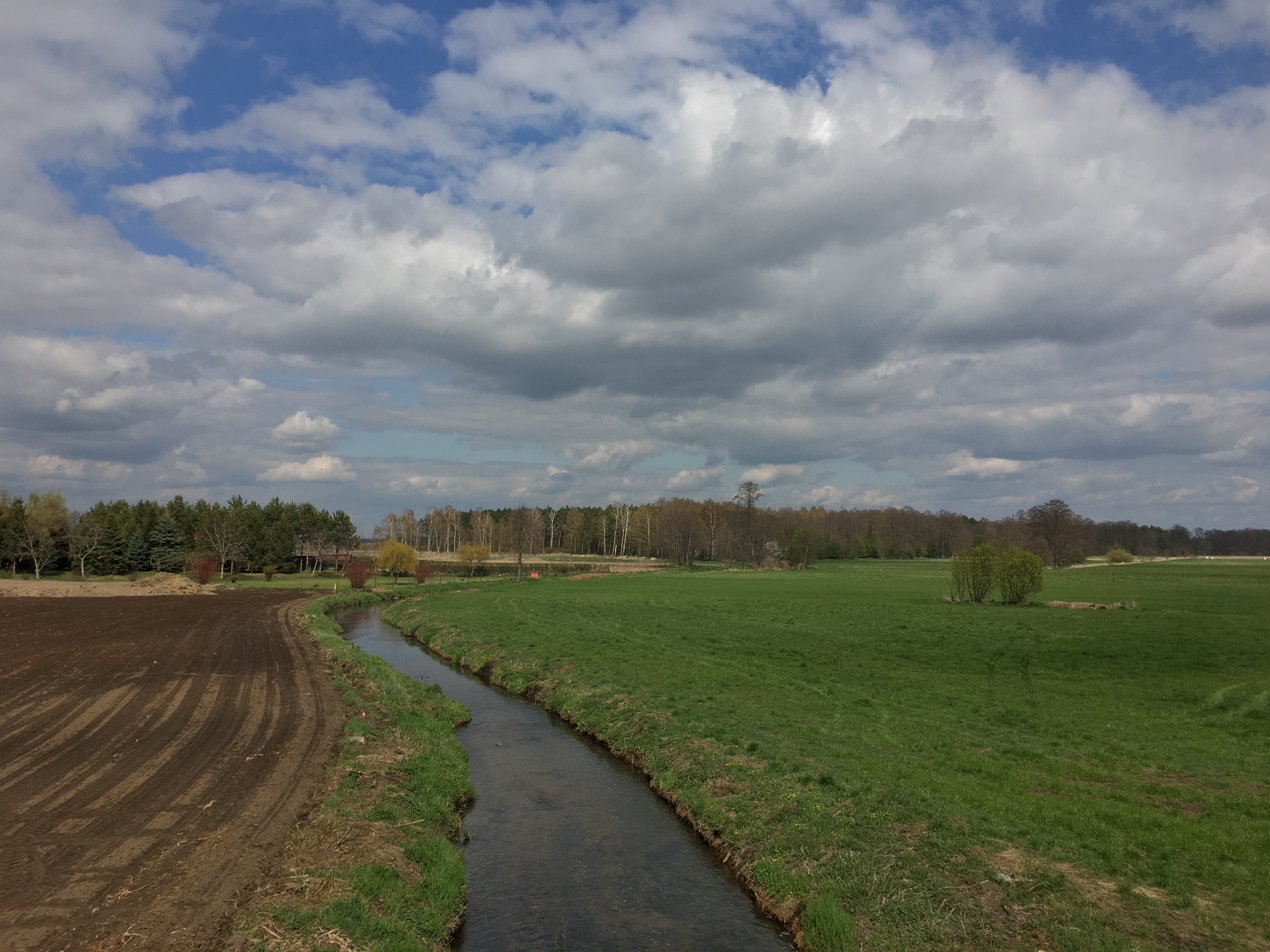

Location
- Country: Poland

Physical characteristics
- Mouth
  - location: Wkra
  - coordinates: 52.6584°N 20.5044°E

Basin features
- Progression: Wkra→ Narew→ Vistula→ Baltic Sea

Płonka is a river in the centre of Poland, right-bank tributary of Wkra. The total length of the river amounts to 41.7 km (25.9 mi). Source of Płonka is located in the vicinity of the village of Staroźreby, mouth near the village of Kołoząb.

== Tributaries ==
- Dzierzążnica
- Żurawianka

== See also ==
- Rivers of Poland
