= Zielonka, Konin County =

Zielonka
- Village
- Location within Poland
- Coordinates: 52°26′N 18°34′E
- Country: Poland
- Voivodeship: Greater Poland
- County: Konin
- Gmina: Wierzbinek
- Time zone: UTC+1 (CET)
  - Summer (DST): UTC+2 (CEST)

Zielonka [ʑɛˈlɔnka] is a village in the administrative district of Gmina Wierzbinek, within Konin County, Greater Poland Voivodeship, in central Poland.
