= Boguszyczki =

- Village
- Location within Poland
- Coordinates: 52°26′39″N 18°31′26″E
- Country: Poland
- Voivodeship: Greater Poland
- County: Konin
- Gmina: Wierzbinek
- Population: 150

Boguszyczki [bɔɡuˈʂɨt͡ʂki] is a village in the administrative district of Gmina Wierzbinek, within Konin County, Greater Poland Voivodeship, in west-central Poland.
