= Rybno, Konin County =

Rybno
- Village
- Location within Poland
- Coordinates: 52°23′49″N 18°27′51″E
- Country: Poland
- Voivodeship: Greater Poland
- County: Konin
- Gmina: Wierzbinek
- Population: 190

Rybno [ˈrɨbnɔ] is a village in the administrative district of Gmina Wierzbinek, within Konin County, Greater Poland Voivodeship, in west-central Poland.
