= Nowe Żochowo =

- Village
- Location within Poland
- Coordinates: 52°38′07″N 20°05′17″E
- Country: Poland
- Voivodeship: Masovian
- County: Płock
- Gmina: Staroźreby

Population (approx.)
  - Total: 88
- Time zone: UTC+1 (CET)
  - Summer (DST): UTC+2 (CEST)
- Vehicle registration: WPL

Nowe Żochowo [ˈnɔvɛ ʐɔˈxɔvɔ] is a village in the administrative district of Gmina Staroźreby, within Płock County, Masovian Voivodeship, in central Poland.
