= Romanowo, Gmina Wierzbinek =

Romanowo
- Village
- Location within Poland
- Coordinates: 52°26′45″N 18°37′21″E
- Country: Poland
- Voivodeship: Greater Poland
- County: Konin
- Gmina: Wierzbinek

Romanowo [rɔmaˈnɔvɔ] is a village in the administrative district of Gmina Wierzbinek, within Konin County, Greater Poland Voivodeship, in west-central Poland.
