= Gaj, Konin County =

Gaj
- Village
- Location within Poland
- Coordinates: 52°25′04″N 18°29′27″E
- Country: Poland
- Voivodeship: Greater Poland
- County: Konin
- Gmina: Wierzbinek

Gaj [ɡai̯] is a village in the administrative district of Gmina Wierzbinek, within Konin County, Greater Poland Voivodeship, in west-central Poland.
