= Sumin, Greater Poland Voivodeship =

Sumin
- Village
- Location within Poland
- Coordinates: 52°25′28″N 18°38′24″E
- Country: Poland
- Voivodeship: Greater Poland
- County: Konin
- Gmina: Wierzbinek

Sumin [ˈsumin] is a village in the administrative district of Gmina Wierzbinek, within Konin County, Greater Poland Voivodeship, in west-central Poland.
