= Suskowo =

- Village
- Location within Poland
- Coordinates: 52°26′21″N 18°31′53″E
- Country: Poland
- Voivodeship: Greater Poland
- County: Konin
- Gmina: Wierzbinek

Suskowo [susˈkɔvɔ] is a village in the administrative district of Gmina Wierzbinek, within Konin County, Greater Poland Voivodeship, in west-central Poland.
