= Dobra Wola, Greater Poland Voivodeship =

Dobra Wola
- Village
- Location within Poland
- Coordinates: 52°28′01″N 18°28′41″E
- Country: Poland
- Voivodeship: Greater Poland
- County: Konin
- Gmina: Wierzbinek

Dobra Wola [ˈdɔbra ˈvɔla] is a village in the administrative district of Gmina Wierzbinek, within Konin County, Greater Poland Voivodeship, in west-central Poland.
