= Boguszyce, Greater Poland Voivodeship =

Boguszyce
- Village
- Location within Poland
- Coordinates: 52°27′N 18°31′E
- Country: Poland
- Voivodeship: Greater Poland
- County: Konin
- Gmina: Wierzbinek

Boguszyce [bɔɡuˈʂɨt͡sɛ] is a village in the administrative district of Gmina Wierzbinek, within Konin County, Greater Poland Voivodeship, in west-central Poland.
