= Dąbrusk =

- Village
- Location within Poland
- Coordinates: 52°38′52″N 19°55′38″E
- Country: Poland
- Voivodeship: Masovian
- County: Płock
- Gmina: Staroźreby
- Time zone: UTC+1 (CET)
  - Summer (DST): UTC+2 (CEST)
- Vehicle registration: WPL

Dąbrusk [ˈdɔmbrusk] is a village in the administrative district of Gmina Staroźreby, within Płock County, Masovian Voivodeship, in central Poland.
