= Żółwiniec, Gmina Wierzbinek =

Żółwiniec
- Village
- Location within Poland
- Coordinates: 52°26′25″N 18°28′40″E
- Country: Poland
- Voivodeship: Greater Poland
- County: Konin
- Gmina: Wierzbinek
- Postal code: 62-619

Żółwiniec [ʐuu̯ˈviɲɛt͡s] is a village in the administrative district of Gmina Wierzbinek, within Konin County, Greater Poland Voivodeship, in central Poland.
