= Majdany, Konin County =

Majdany
- Village
- Location within Poland
- Coordinates: 52°26′26″N 18°30′57″E
- Country: Poland
- Voivodeship: Greater Poland
- County: Konin
- Gmina: Wierzbinek

Majdany (Polish pronunciation: [majˈdanɨ]) is a village in the administrative district of Gmina Wierzbinek, within Konin County, Greater Poland Voivodeship, in west-central Poland.
