= Ciepłowo =

- Village
- Location within Poland
- Coordinates: 52°24′10″N 18°26′52″E
- Country: Poland
- Voivodeship: Greater Poland
- County: Konin
- Gmina: Wierzbinek
- Population: 30

Ciepłowo (Polish: [t͡ɕɛˈpwɔvɔ]) is a village in the administrative district of Gmina Wierzbinek, within Konin County, Greater Poland Voivodeship, in west-central Poland.
