= Janowice, Gmina Wierzbinek =

Janowice
- Village
- Location within Poland
- Coordinates: 52°28′21″N 18°30′58″E
- Country: Poland
- Voivodeship: Greater Poland
- County: Konin
- Gmina: Wierzbinek
- Population: 100

Janowice [janɔˈvit͡sɛ] is a village in the administrative district of Gmina Wierzbinek, within Konin County, Greater Poland Voivodeship, in west-central Poland.
