= Władysławowo, Gmina Wierzbinek =

Władysławowo
- Village
- Location within Poland
- Coordinates: 52°27′36″N 18°35′32″E
- Country: Poland
- Voivodeship: Greater Poland
- County: Konin
- Gmina: Wierzbinek
- Population: 70

Władysławowo [vwadɨswaˈvɔvɔ] is a village in the administrative district of Gmina Wierzbinek, within Konin County, Greater Poland Voivodeship, in west-central Poland.
