= Słomkowo, Greater Poland Voivodeship =

Słomkowo
- Village
- Location within Poland
- Coordinates: 52°28′N 18°28′E
- Country: Poland
- Voivodeship: Greater Poland
- County: Konin
- Gmina: Wierzbinek

Słomkowo [swɔmˈkɔvɔ] is a village in the administrative district of Gmina Wierzbinek, in Konin County, Greater Poland Voivodeship, in west-central Poland.
