= Staroźreby =

- Town
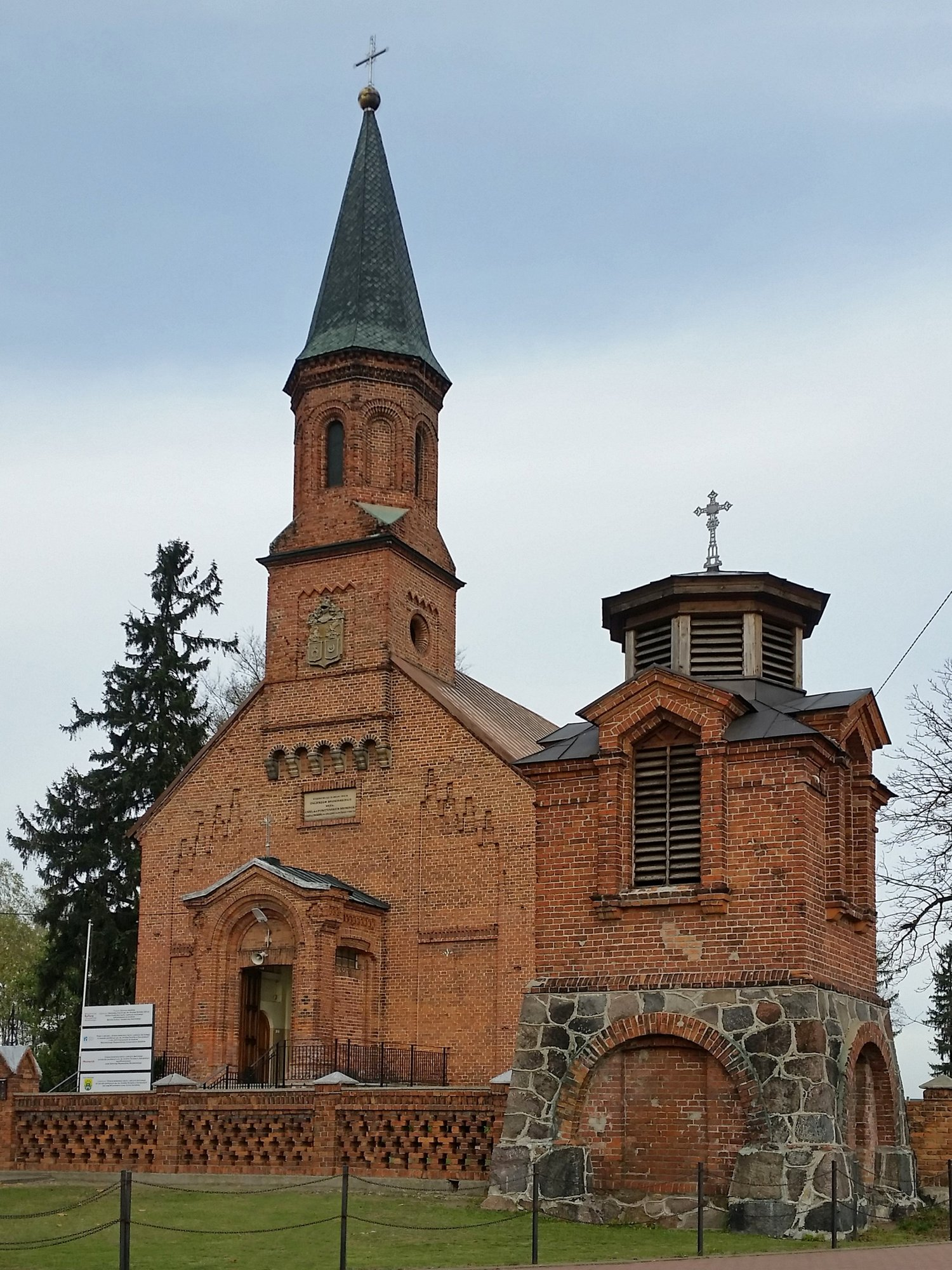
- Holy Guardian Angels church in Staroźreby

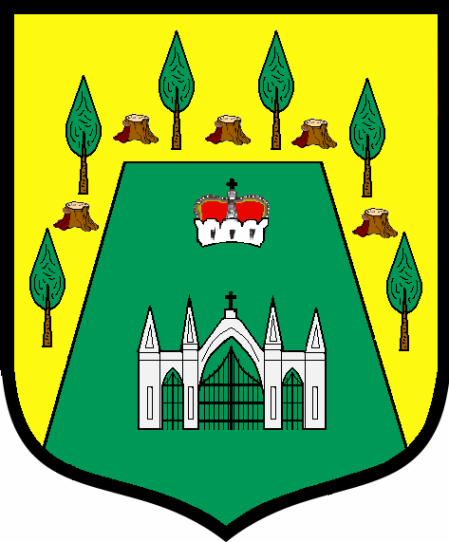
- Coat of arms

- Location within Poland
- Coordinates: 52°38′N 19°59′E
- Country: Poland
- Voivodeship: Masovian
- County: Płock
- Gmina: Staroźreby
- Time zone: UTC+1 (CET)
  - Summer (DST): UTC+2 (CEST)
- Postal code: 09-440
- Vehicle registration: WPL
- Website: http://www.starozreby.pl/

Staroźreby [starɔˈʑrɛbɨ] is a town in Płock County, Masovian Voivodeship, in central Poland. It is the seat of the gmina (administrative district) called Gmina Staroźreby.

== History ==
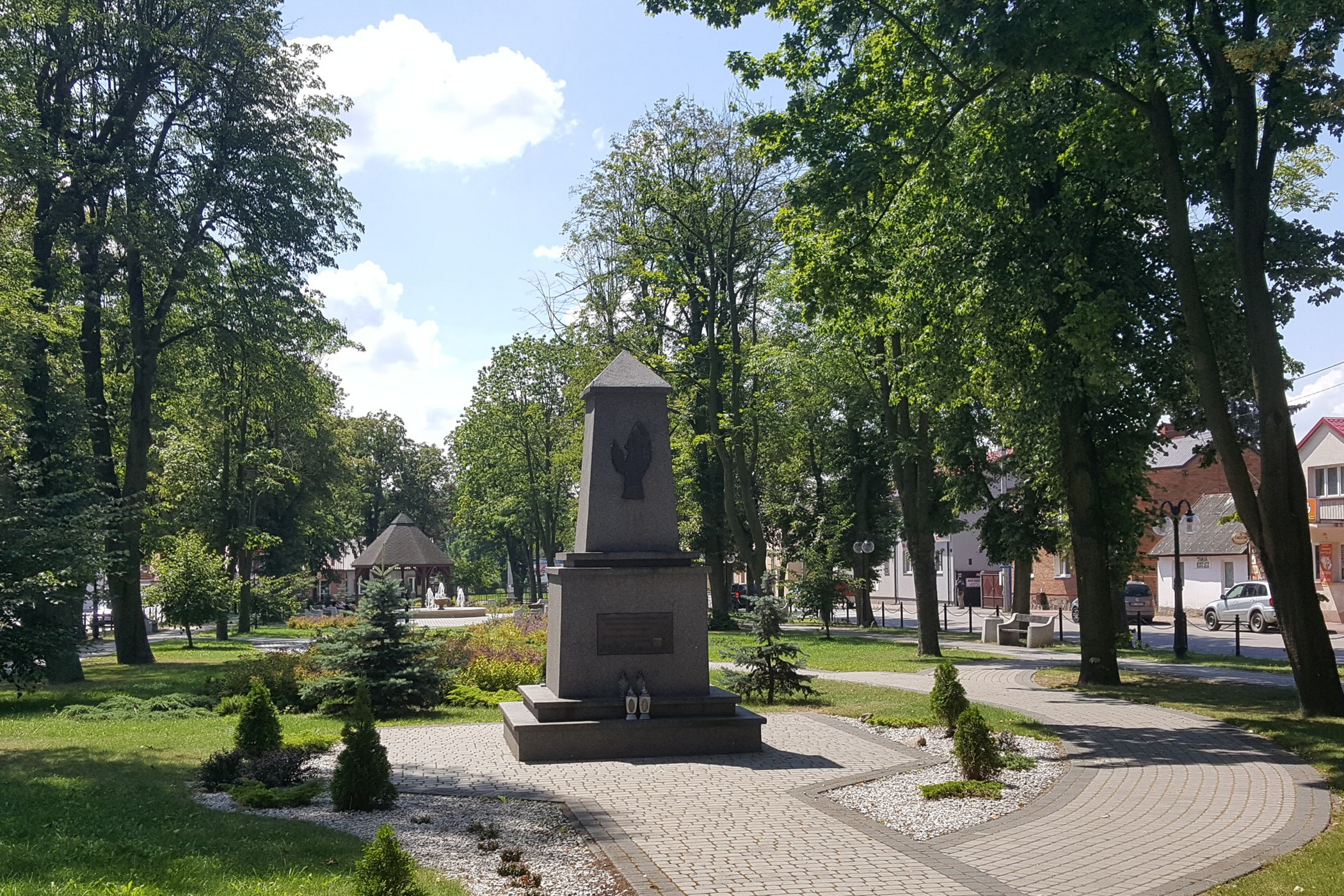
Memorial to local victims of World War II

The local Catholic parish was founded in c. 1402. Staroźreby was a private village, administratively located in the Bielsk County in the Płock Voivodeship in the Greater Poland Province of the Kingdom of Poland. In the 16th century, the settlement passed to the Sobiejuski family of Dołęga coat of arms, which hailed from Sobiejuchy, and then took the surname Staroźrebski after their new seat.

According to the 1921 census, Staroźreby with the adjacent manor farm had a population of 1,105, 98.1% Polish and 1.8% Jewish by declared nationality.

Following the German-Soviet invasion of Poland, which started World War II in September 1939, Staroźreby was occupied by Germany until 1945. The local Polish police chief was murdered by the Russians in the Katyn massacre in 1940. The local Polish parish priest Jan Zawidzki was murdered by the Germans in the Soldau concentration camp in 1941. In 1945, Staroźreby was restored to Poland, although with a Soviet-installed communist regime, which remained in power until the Fall of Communism in the end of the 1980s. On 15 September 1948, the Polish anti-communist resistance took control of Staroźreby and executed three communists.
