= Słomkowo, Masovian Voivodeship =

Słomkowo
- Village
- Location within Poland
- Coordinates: 52°36′N 19°59′E
- Country: Poland
- Voivodeship: Masovian
- County: Płock
- Gmina: Staroźreby
- Time zone: UTC+1 (CET)
  - Summer (DST): UTC+2 (CEST)
- Vehicle registration: WPL

Słomkowo [swɔmˈkɔvɔ] is a village in the administrative district of Gmina Staroźreby, within Płock County, Masovian Voivodeship, in central Poland.
