= Zaryn Dentzel =

American computer scientist and entrepreneur

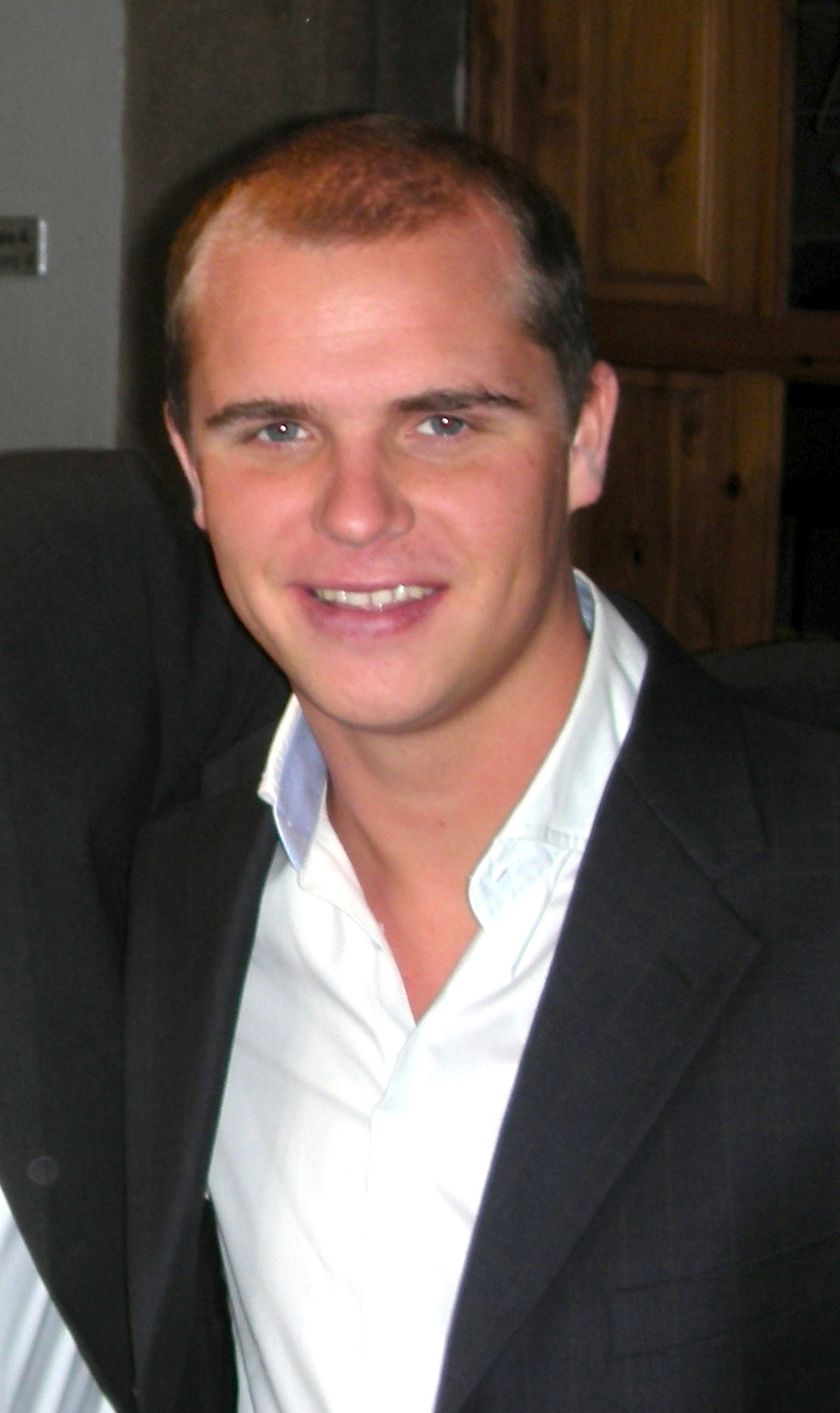
- Dentzel in 2008
- Born: 8 June 1983 (age 42); Santa Barbara, California, U.S.
- Occupations: Computer scientist, entrepreneur

Zaryn Dentzel (Santa Barbara, California, born 1983) is an American computer scientist and entrepreneur. He founded Tuenti in 2006. There was attempt to steal millions in Bitcoins in 2021. Dentzel was born in Santa Barbara, California in 1983. He moved to Spain in the 1990s.

== Biography ==
In 1998, Zaryn landed in Spain on a student exchange. He left California to learn Spanish and immerse himself in Spanish culture in the town of Cabeza del Buey in Extremadura. This powerful experience was to influence his future activities. After a year of study in Spain, he returned to the United States, where he completed his high school education and began his college studies. He studied international relations and Spanish literature at the University of California and Occidental College. It was there that he developed an interest in social networking, while keeping in touch with his friends in Spain and the idea that they could create a social network. In 2006, he returned to Spain and, together with Félix Ruiz, Joaquín and Kenny, started to build Tuenti, initially a social network for teenagers.

Dentzel also created a phone company that was launched in 2012 under the Tuenti Móvil brand. In 2013 he published the book "El futuro lo decides tú" which tells the story of Tuenti. Since January 2015, he has also been Strategic Advisor for Telefónica Digital Transformation.

In 2016, Telefónica, the company that owns Tuenti, definitively closed down all the functionalities related to the former social network, which currently remains a virtual telephone operator after having spent 70 million euros to buy it.
