= Kazimierzewo, Greater Poland Voivodeship =

Kazimierzewo
- Village
- Location within Poland
- Coordinates: 52°26′23″N 18°37′19″E
- Country: Poland
- Voivodeship: Greater Poland
- County: Konin
- Gmina: Wierzbinek
- Population: 80

Kazimierzewo [kaʑimjɛˈʐɛvɔ] is a village in the administrative district of Gmina Wierzbinek, within Konin County, Greater Poland Voivodeship, in west-central Poland.
