= Żaryn =

Żaryn is a Polish surname. Notable people with the surname include:

- Aleksandra Żaryn (1916–2010), Polish translator, lawyer and social activist, Righteous Among the Nations
- Jan Żaryn (born 1958), Polish historian and politician
- Stanisław Żaryn (1913–1964), Polish architect, urbanist, historian and academic teacher
