= Leszczyc, Greater Poland Voivodeship =

Leszczyc
- Village
- Location within Poland
- Coordinates: 52°25′59″N 18°38′59″E
- Country: Poland
- Voivodeship: Greater Poland
- County: Konin
- Gmina: Wierzbinek

Leszczyc [ˈlɛʂt͡ʂɨt͡s] is a village in the administrative district of Gmina Wierzbinek, within Konin County, Greater Poland Voivodeship, in west-central Poland.
