= Julianowo, Greater Poland Voivodeship =

Julianowo
- Village
- Location within Poland
- Coordinates: 52°27′13″N 18°33′26″E
- Country: Poland
- Voivodeship: Greater Poland
- County: Konin
- Gmina: Wierzbinek

Julianowo [juljaˈnɔvɔ] is a village in the administrative district of Gmina Wierzbinek, within Konin County, Greater Poland Voivodeship, in west-central Poland.
