= Nowa Ruda, Greater Poland Voivodeship =

Nowa Ruda
- Village
- Location within Poland
- Coordinates: 52°25′07″N 18°21′33″E
- Country: Poland
- Voivodeship: Greater Poland
- County: Konin
- Gmina: Wierzbinek

Nowa Ruda [ˈnɔva ˈruda] is a village in the administrative district of Gmina Wierzbinek, within Konin County, Greater Poland Voivodeship, in west-central Poland.
