= Wkra =

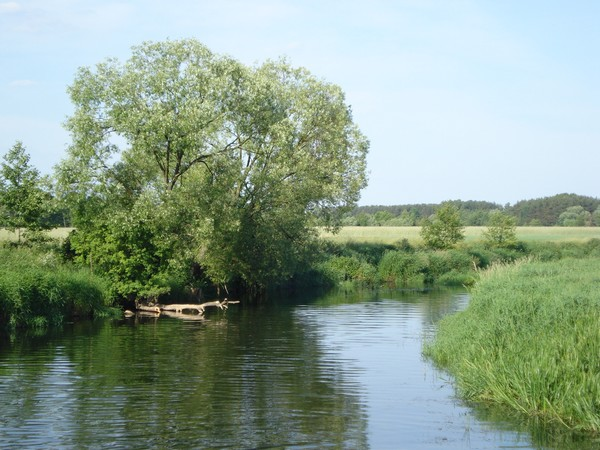

Location
- Country: Poland

Physical characteristics
- Mouth
  - location: Narew
  - coordinates: 52°26′45″N 20°44′43″E
- Length: 255 km (158 mi)
- Basin size: 5,348 km^{2} (2,065 sq mi)
- Discharge
  - average: 22.3 m^{3}/s (790 cu ft/s)

Basin features
- Progression: Narew→ Vistula→ Baltic Sea

Wkra is a river in north-eastern Poland, a tributary of the Narew river, with a length of 255 kilometres and a basin area of 5,348 km^{2} - all within Poland. Among its tributaries are the Łydynia and the Płonka.

Towns and townships:

- Bieżuń
- Radzanów
- Strzegowo
- Glinojeck
- Sochocin
- Joniec
- Pomiechówek
- Nowy Dwór Mazowiecki

See also:

Rivers of Poland
