= AMP Building =

AMP Building, or variants, is the current or former name of the following buildings:

- AMP Building, Sydney, New South Wales, Australia
- Australian Mutual Provident Society head office, Sydney, New South Wales, Australia
- Quay Quarter Tower, Sydney, New South Wales, Australia
- Sydney Tower, Sydney, New South Wales, Australia
- AMP Place, Brisbane, Queensland, Australia
- MacArthur Chambers, Brisbane, Queensland, Australia
- AMP Building, Rockhampton, Queensland, Australia
- Magnetic House, Townsville, Queensland, Australia
- Australian Mutual Provident Society Building, Townsville, Queensland, Australia
- NAB House, Hobart, Tasmania, Australia
- AMP Square, Melbourne, Victoria, Australia
- 140 St Georges Terrace, Perth, Western Australia, Australia
- AMP Society Building, Wellington, New Zealand

== See also ==
- AMP Limited
