= Tomaszów =

Tomaszów may refer to the following places in Poland:

- Tomaszów Bolesławiecki, village in Lower Silesian Voivodeship
- Tomaszów, Lublin Voivodeship, village in Puławy County
- Tomaszów County, county in Lublin Voivodeship
  - Tomaszów Lubelski, town and county seat
- Tomaszów County, county in Łódź Voivodeship
  - Tomaszów Mazowiecki, town and county seat
- Tomaszów, Opoczno County, village in Łódź Voivodeship
- Tomaszów, Radomsko County, settlement in Łódź Voivodeship
- Tomaszów, Gmina Opatów, village in Opatów County, Świętokrzyskie Voivodeship
- Tomaszów, Gmina Tarłów, village in Opatów County, Świętokrzyskie Voivodeship
- Tomaszów, Pińczów County, village in Świętokrzyskie Voivodeship
- Tomaszów, Radom County, village in Masovian Voivodeship
- Tomaszów, Szydłowiec County, village in Masovian Voivodeship

== See also ==
- Tomaszówka (disambiguation)
- Tomaszewo (disambiguation)
- Tomaszew (disambiguation)
