= Magnetic House =

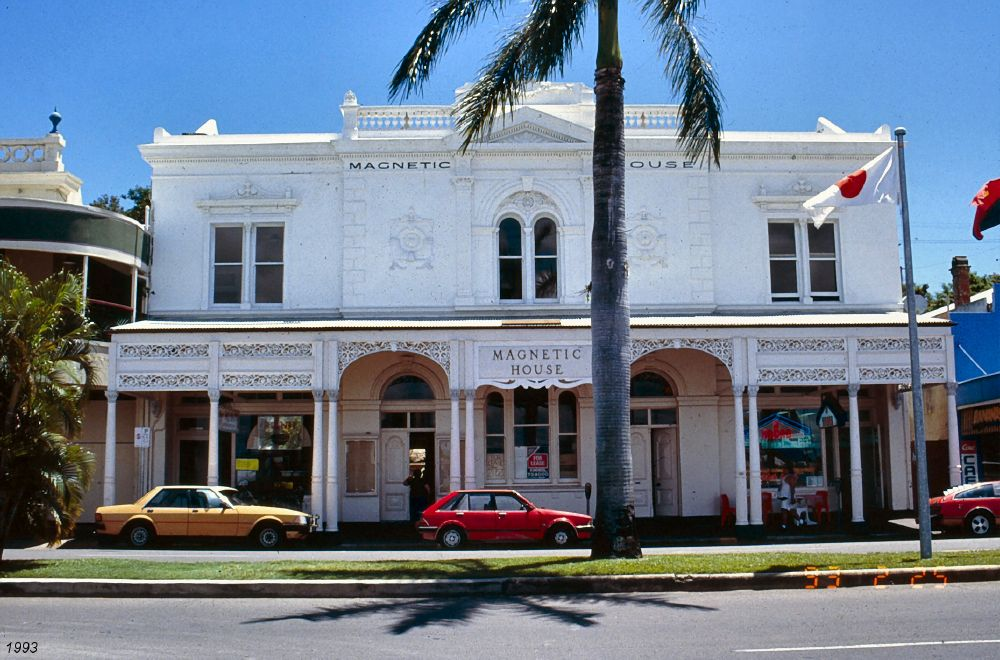
- Magnetic House, 1993

- Location within Queensland Location within Australia
- 19.2571°S 146.8205°E
- Location: 143–149 Flinders Street East, Townsville, City of Townsville, Queensland, Australia

History
- Design period: 1870s–1890s (late 19th century)
- Built: 1886–1888

Site notes
- Architect(s): C H E Blackmann & John Sulman
- Architectural styles: Classicism, Victorian Filigree

Queensland Heritage Register
- Official name: Magnetic House, AMP Building
- Type: state heritage (built)
- Designated: 21 August 1992
- Reference no.: 600892
- Significant period: 1880s (fabric); 1888–1938 (historical use by AMP)
- Significant components: strong room
- Builders: Dennis Kelleher

The Magnetic House is a heritage-listed office building at 143–149 Flinders Street East, Townsville, City of Townsville, Queensland, Australia. It was designed by C H E Blackmann & John Sulman and built from 1886 to 1888 by Dennis Kelleher. It was later known as Magnetic House. It was added to the Queensland Heritage Register on 21 August 1992.

== History ==
This two-storeyed masonry building was erected in 1886–88 at a cost of nearly £6,500, as the Townsville office of the Sydney-based Australian Mutual Provident Society. The site was acquired by the society in 1885.

The AMP Society had been established in Sydney in 1848/49 under the NSW Friendly Society's Act of 1843, and was one of a number of benefit and friendly societies established in the Australian colonies in the mid and late 19th century. Founded by a group of prominent Sydney philanthropists, the AMP Society initially offered life assurance policies, endowments and annuities, aimed principally at ensuring that women and children were not left destitute on the death of the principal income earner.

Growth in the early 1850s was slow, but in 1857 the society was incorporated by act of parliament, and by the 1890s it was the most prominent of the Australian benefit and insurance societies, with a world-wide reputation. The first Queensland office was opened in Brisbane in 1875, followed by Townsville in 1883, Maryborough in 1884, and Rockhampton in 1886.

The first Townsville office opened in a small timber building. It serviced North and Central Queensland centres as far afield as Cooktown, Mossman, Ravenswood, Winton, Mackay, Blackall and Tambo, and loans and mortgages from the society could be raised against policy or property. By the mid-1880s the Townsville branch had proved so successful that substantial new accommodation for the society was proposed, on a site fronting Flinders Street East, then Townsville's principal business address.

The new building was designed by prominent Sydney architects CHE Blackmann and John Sulman (later Sir John). It appears that the design was initiated by Blackmann in late 1885 or early 1886, prior to Sulman joining him in partnership sometime in 1886. Within a few months of the partnership being established, Blackmann fled the country, leaving Sulman to pay his debts, and Sulman probably supervised the final drawings and interior fittings for the Townsville building during 1886–1887.

The contract was let to Townsville builder Dennis Kelleher in 1886, and the society moved into their new premises in January 1888, occupying two rooms on the ground floor: a spacious, cedar-fitted public office at the front, and the district secretary's office, with strongroom, at the rear. The remainder of the ground floor contained two shops, which were let to tenants. The upper floor comprised office accommodation, with strongrooms, let to business and professional persons. At the time, the building was considered a handsome addition to Flinders Street.

Above the pediment was a marble tableau illustrating the society's motto Amicus certus in re incerta (a certain friend in uncertain times). The tableau depicted an erect female figure, with a cornucopia by her right side, holding the palm of victory above a seated woman and child to her left. To her right was a seated male figure, alienated from the family grouping. Until the logo was changed in 1988, an Amicus tableau was erected on every AMP building, and usually was removed when the society no longer occupied the premises. AMP occupied the Flinders Street East building until 1938, when their new premises, a three-storeyed building at the corner of Stanley and Flinders Streets, was completed. The Amicus tableau appears to have been removed to the new building.

The Flinders Street East building was sold in 1940, renamed Magnetic House prior to 1978, and has remained principally as shop and office accommodation. Between 1978 and 1982 the building was renovated, and the upper floor housed Tonnoirs Fine Arts Gallery from 1978 to 1990.

== Description ==
The first Townsville AMP Building is a two-storeyed rendered masonry building, with a corrugated iron gable roof behind a parapeted facade, located on the north side of Flinders Street at the base of Melton Hill. The building houses three shops to the ground floor and offices to the first floor, with the symmetrical facade being composed of three sections.

The protruding central section has a triple-arched sash window with arched doorways, with recessed double timber doors, to either side. The eastern door enters the centre shop, and the western door leads into a through corridor and stairs to the first floor. The first floor features a central double-arch sash window framed by pilasters supporting a pediment, with a decorative relief and quoining to either side and a balustrade and laurelled plinth above on which the AMP statue originally stood. The street awning has paired cast-iron columns, a central sign with the words MAGNETIC HOUSE, and an arched cast-iron valance to either side.

The two end sections have a timber-framed glass shop window bay with recessed door. The first floor has a double sash window surmounted by a decorative pediment and a cornice to the roofline. The street awning is supported by single cast-iron columns and has a deep cast-iron valance.

The rear of the building has an open first-floor verandah, with a toilet enclosure to either end, with timber posts and cast-iron balustrade. The ground-floor verandah has been enclosed to form kitchens and has metal flues which extend to above the roofline.

Internally, the central shop features a ceiling rose, plaster cornices, a strong room at the rear and sash windows into the enclosed rear verandah. The two end shops have been recently fitted out as fast food outlets with drop ceilings and modern fixtures, with the eastern shop's strongroom being converted to a coldroom. The corridor leads to a timber stair with turned balustrade.

The first floor consists of a central corridor with offices either side, three of which have strongrooms. All joinery has been painted, doors have been rehung and amber bottle glass panels inserted in fanlights and some doors.

The rear of the site has a large concrete area with a brick retaining wall and a small toilet structure.

== Heritage listing ==
Magnetic House was listed on the Queensland Heritage Register on 21 August 1992 having satisfied the following criteria.

The place is important in demonstrating the evolution or pattern of Queensland's history.

Magnetic House is important in demonstrating the evolution of Townsville as the principal town and port of North Queensland in the late 19th century.

The place demonstrates rare, uncommon or endangered aspects of Queensland's cultural heritage.

Magnetic House demonstrates two rare aspects of Queensland's cultural heritage, being one of the few known examples of the Queensland work of important Sydney architects CHE Blackmann and J Sulman. Magnetic House is one of the few substantially intact examples of its type surviving in Townsville.

The place is important in demonstrating the principal characteristics of a particular class of cultural places.

Magnetic House is important in demonstrating the principal characteristics of a compact, two-storeyed, masonry Queensland regional office building of the late 19th century.

The place is important because of its aesthetic significance.

Magnetic House is important in exhibiting a range of aesthetic characteristics valued by the Townsville community, in particular its quality of design and composition of classical elements, its contribution to the Flinders Street streetscape and Townsville townscape and the quality of its cast-iron work.

The place has a special association with the life or work of a particular person, group or organisation of importance in Queensland's history.

Magnetic House has a special association with the important AMP Society and their contribution to the development of North Queensland in the late 19th/early 20th centuries.
