= Australian Mutual Provident Society Building =

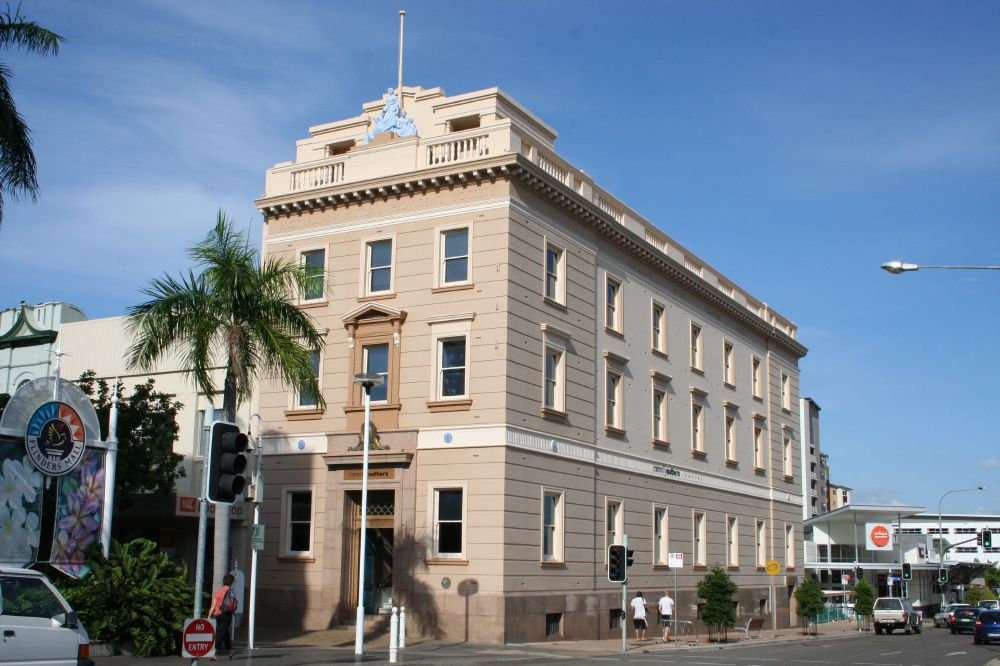
- Australian Mutual Provident Society Building, Townsville

- Location within Queensland Location within Australia
- 19.2614°S 146.816°E
- Location: 416–418 Flinders Street, Townsville CBD, City of Townsville, Queensland, Australia

History
- Design period: 1919–1930s (interwar period)
- Built: 1937–1938

Site notes
- Architect: Hall and Cook
- Architectural style: Classicism

Queensland Heritage Register
- Official name: Australian Mutual Provident Society Building (former), AMP Building (former), Connolly Suthers Lawyers
- Type: state heritage (built)
- Designated: 1 August 2005
- Reference no.: 602159
- Significant period: 1930s (fabric); 1938–1990s (historical use)
- Significant components: residential accommodation – caretaker's quarters, statue, basement / sub-floor, furniture/fittings, flagpole/flagstaff
- Builders: Stuart Brothers

The Australian Mutual Provident Society Building is a heritage-listed office building at 416–418 Flinders Street, Townsville CBD, City of Townsville, Queensland, Australia. It was designed by Hall and Cook and built from 1937 to 1938 by Stuart Brothers. It is also known as the former AMP Building and Connolly Suthers Lawyers. It was added to the Queensland Heritage Register on 1 August 2005.

== History ==
The Australian Mutual Provident Society building (AMP Society), located on the corner of Flinders and Stanley Streets, Townsville, was completed in 1938. It was the second building in Townsville to be purpose-designed for the AMP as its North Queensland regional office.

The Australian Mutual Provident Society was formed in 1849 to provide facilities for life assurance on the mutual principle for people in New South Wales. Within fifty years of its inception it was well known for its application of bonuses, and also for the "practice of sustaining policies in force by advancing premiums from the surrender value".

On 31 August 1848 Rev William Horatio Walsh, Thomas Holt, Thomas Sutcliffe Mort, Chas Lowe and William Perry met in Sydney to discuss the formation and prospectus of a company to provide life assurance. The company was formed under the then Friendly Society's Act.

Only 321 policies had been issued by the Society during the five years from its inception but by 1856 it was felt necessary to obtain an Act of Incorporation. The Friendly Societies' Act, under which the Society was registered, did not afford sufficient opportunity for the expansion and extension of its business. The Act was assented to by Parliament on 18 March 1857. The Act provided for the first time in any country for the protection within certain limits of the proceeds of life policies and annuities against the claims of creditors, and this Society was the first office in the world to issue policies subject to this protection.

As the business of the Society progressed, agencies were extended throughout the Australasian colonies, with branches in New Zealand and England. A district agency was established in Townsville in April 1883 in rented premises consisting of a galvanized iron-roofed wooden building about 16 by 12 feet (4.9 by 3.7 m). It serviced North Queensland centres as far a field as Cooktown, Mossman, Ravenswood, Winton, Mackay, Blackall and Tambo, and loans and mortgages from the Society could be raised against policy or property.

By the mid-1880s the Townsville branch had proved so successful that substantial new accommodation for the Society was proposed, on a site fronting Flinders Street East, then Townsville's principal business address. The land was purchased in 1885 at a cost of £1400. The First AMP Building in Townsville was an impressive two-storeyed brick building, designed by Sydney architects CHE Blackmann and John (later Sir John) Sulman, was erected in 1886/87 and occupied in January 1888.

Townsville members of the Society (policy holders) requested the establishment of a Local Board in October 1887. Problems raised in relation to the establishment of a Local Board included the estimated considerable cost involved and, if the request was granted, an expected demand for Local Boards at Maryborough and Rockhampton. The whole question appeared to depend on "separation" of the proposed Colony of North Queensland. It was decided that Townsville was not sufficiently advanced for the establishment of a Branch, but the progress of the "separation movement" should be watched and, should a decision for separation be made that a Local Branch would be established at whichever of the northern towns to be selected as the capital of the new colony.

By 1937 it was decided by the Society that, with the industrial growth and development of North Queensland, larger premises must be constructed. This building, designed by Brisbane architects Francis Hall and Harold Cook, and built by Stuart Bros Pty Ltd, was again located in Flinders Street, but further west, to where the focus of commercial activity had shifted. Local labour and materials were used where possible on the construction of the building with the pink granite facing from the Hervey Range area being mined and installed by Melrose and Fenwick, prominent local stonemasons.

The three storey brick building, with a frontage of 33 feet (10 m) to Flinders Street and 114 feet 9 inches (34.98 m) along Sturt Street, was officially opened on the 21 February 1938 by the Deputy Chairman of the AMP's Queensland Board, Brigadier-General Lachlan Chisholm Wilson. The ground floor was occupied by the Society, with two offices let to tenants, and the first and second floors set aside for letting purposes. Provision was made for caretaker's quarters. The building is described in 1938 as having lighting, power, sanitation and air-conditioning designed on the most modern lines. It was the first building in Townsville to have air-conditioning.

The AMP Society was active in assisting the economic development of the Townsville community during a period of worldwide financial unrest. A 650 feet (200 m) extension of the Townsville wharf was completed in June 1929 with a loan of £25,000 from the Society to the Harbour Board.

The Townsville AMP Building with its conservative expression through the use of classical motifs, symmetry and pediments is a typical example of an Insurance building of the inter-war period. A restrained classical style was popular for public buildings during the 1920s and 1930s throughout the country and provided a solid image for insurance companies, banks and government buildings.

Above the pediment was a marble tableau illustrating the Society's motto Amicus certus in re incerta [a certain friend in an uncertain event]. Until the Society's logo was changed in 1988, an Amicus tableau was erected on every AMP building, and usually was removed when the Society no longer occupied the premises. At Townsville, the Amicus was moved from the 1886/87 building at Flinders Street East to the new building at the corner of Stanley and Flinders Streets when the AMP shifted in 1938. The tableau depicts an erect female figure, with a cornucopia by her right side, holding the palm of victory above a seated woman and child to her left. To her right is a seated male figure, alienated from the family grouping.

The origin of the Amicus statues dates to the establishment of the Society in 1857. From its inception, AMP Society policies featured a steel engraving of the port of Sydney, and underneath, a representation of the Society's seal, designed by artist OR Campbell. The seal comprised a central figure with plume and cornucopia, two subordinate figures, a castle and a rising sun. [The Australian Imperial Forces in the Great War later adopted the Sun badge.] At the foot of the statuary appeared the Society's motto: "Amicus Certus in Re Incerta". During a period of rapid growth in the 1860s a Victorian sculptor, J Summers, was commissioned to execute the Society's seal as a statuary tableaux for its headquarters building in Pitt Street, Sydney. The Amicus statue soon became a familiar icon on all AMP buildings.

The 1938 building underwent a restoration process in 1978 at a cost of $600,000. The wood panelling and the ceiling in the main chamber were restored, the granite plinth was partially sandblasted and the exterior of the building painted.

The building was purchased in the mid-1990s by Connolly & Suthers, a prominent Townsville law firm.

== Description ==
The former AMP Society Building is situated on the corner of Flinders and Stanley Streets, at the western end of Flinders Street Mall. A five storeyed steel framed structure with concrete floors and cement rendered brick infill walls, it consists of three main floors, a basement and a smaller upper level which contains a former caretakers flat and roof deck. Prominently located in Townsville's main street, the building has a simple rectangular form distinguished by elegant proportions and street facades that are decorated in a stripped classical manner.

The building has a frontage of 33 feet (10 m) to Flinders Street and 114 feet 9 inches (34.98 m) to Stanley Street. Built to the property alignments, the street facades are treated with banded rustication. The base of the building and decorative elements around the main entrance are faced with red granite. A frieze with medallions delineates the first floor level. A further frieze at the top of the building is inscribed with the AMP name. Above the cornice, a parapet wall with alternating panels of blank wall and classical balusters forms the balustrade around the roof deck level. The uppermost level, a few rooms in a simplified classical style, is visible behind the parapet.

Along Stanley Street the ground slopes down from the Flinders Street corner revealing the basement level. A timber panelled door, situated at the southeastern end of the Stanley Street elevation, opens directly into the basement. Windows to the basement level are fitted with wrought iron grilles. The simple repetitive Stanley Street facade has rows of generously proportioned timber double hung windows.

The tall narrow Flinders Street facade, being the front of the building, is the most embellished. The main entrance is in the center of this symmetrical facade with a window on either side. The entrance has a decorative surround in red granite. A cornice over the entrance supports a cartouche. The window immediately above the entrance is surmounted by a broken bed pediment. Other windows on this level have a projecting cornice where as the windows on the levels above and below have only simple architraves. The AMP Society emblematic statuary complete with flagpole is located above the entrance at the roof deck level, further emphasizing the center of the Flinders Street facade.

The ground floor level is raised slightly above the Flinders Street pavement. Three granite steps lead to paneled entrance doors with a metal transom grille over, in a pattern reminiscent of fish scales. The richly finished entrance vestibule is lined with a reddish marble. A pair of glazed timber doors with brass handles and kickplate and an elaborate fanlight over opens onto the main business chamber. A dogleg terrazzo stair, which extends to the roof level, has a timber handrail and decorative wrought iron balustrade. The walls in the stairwell are lined with black and yellow ochre coloured tiles.

The loftily proportioned business chamber retains many original fittings and finishes including timber paneling, timber counters with marble tops and timber and glass screens. A coffered plaster ceiling with large cornices is supported by pilasters with Corinthian capitals.

== Heritage listing ==
Australian Mutual Provident Society Building (former) was listed on the Queensland Heritage Register on 1 August 2005 having satisfied the following criteria.

The place is important in demonstrating the evolution or pattern of Queensland's history.

The former AMP Building, the third premises of the Society in Townsville, demonstrates the evolution of commerce in north Queensland and its contribution to the development of Townsville as a regional centre. The new location shows the shift to the west, of the focus of business activity on Flinders Street since the 1880s.

The place is important in demonstrating the principal characteristics of a particular class of cultural places.

The Townsville AMP Building is an intact example of a commercial building of the interwar period and retains many of its original fittings and finishes. Designed in a restrained classical style with an ordered arrangement of internal spaces, it is an excellent example of an insurance building of the period.

The place is important because of its aesthetic significance.

The AMP building, a landmark at the intersection of Flinders and Stanley Streets, contributes to the streetscape of Flinders Street through its prominent location and carefully designed facades. Along with other two-storey buildings in Flinders Street, it enhances the visual impact of the street. It is an important part of the historic streetscape of Flinders street, which has long been the main street of Townsville.

The place has a special association with the life or work of a particular person, group or organisation of importance in Queensland's history.

The building, with its emblematic statuary and name emblazoned on the facade of the building, has clear associations with the AMP society, a company that was, and still is, well known and important in Queensland's history. The building's prominent street address and strong architectural design reflects the company's powerful presence in the main streets of many of Queensland's towns and cities. The building was designed by prominent architects Hall and Cook, who also designed the AMP's Queensland headquarters erected in Brisbane in 1931–34, and who had a notable presence in North Queensland in the 1930s.
