= Boer War Memorial, Allora =

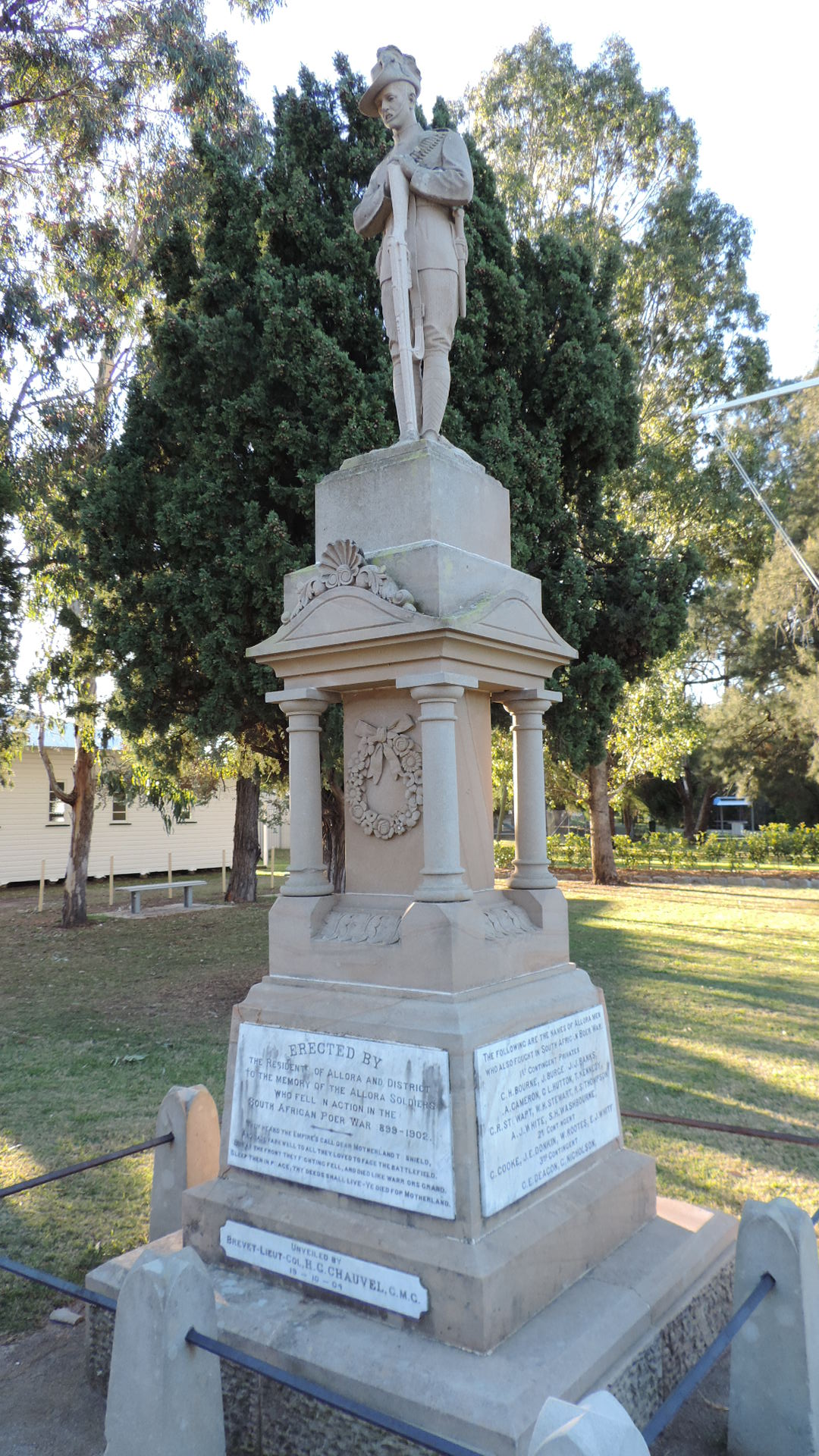
- Boer War Memorial, Allora, 2015

- Location within Queensland Location within Australia
- 28.0351°S 151.9865°E
- Location: Warwick Street, Allora, Southern Downs Region, Queensland, Australia

History
- Design period: 1900–1914 (early 20th century)
- Built: 1904–1940s

Queensland Heritage Register
- Official name: Boer War Memorial and Park, Queen's Park, War Memorial Park
- Type: state heritage (built)
- Designated: 21 October 1992
- Reference no.: 600005
- Significant period: 1904–
- Significant components: memorial – soldier statue, memorial surrounds/railings, park / green space, memorial – obelisk, fencing, fence/wall – perimeter

The Boer War Memorial is a heritage-listed memorial at Warwick Street, Allora, Southern Downs Region, Queensland, Australia. It was built from 1904 to 1940s. It is also known as Queen's Park and War Memorial Park. It was added to the Queensland Heritage Register on 21 October 1992.

== History ==
The War Memorial Park in Allora contains memorials to the Second Boer War, unveiled in 1904; World War I unveiled in 1921 and also a later memorial to World War II and more recent international conflicts with which Australia was involved.

The land on which the memorials are now situated was part of a larger package of land bound by Dalrymple Creek, Warwick, Raff and Church Streets, which was proclaimed a park for recreation in the Queensland Government Gazette of 12 July 1902. However, early survey maps of Allora, dating from 1879 show this area of land set aside for recreational purposes. In 1903 a small section of the park in the south western corner was officially set aside as a Drill Shed Reserve.

Three digger memorials to fallen soldiers were built in Queensland following the Boer War which lasted from 1899 until 1902. The memorial at Allora was the first planned in 1904, followed in 1908 by the Boer War Memorial at Gatton and, lastly, the South African War Memorial in Brisbane unveiled in 1919. Although the term "digger" came into popular use only after World War I it is still thought to be appropriate to use the term describing figural memorials constructed commemorating soldiers from the Boer War. Many other types of memorials, including avenues of trees, bells, plaques and obelisks were erected in Queensland following the Boer War.

The construction of war memorials in Queensland became more widespread after the Boer War, when the State sustained the loss of 67 soldiers on the battlefields. Following World War I the practice of erecting monuments to the fallen soldiers became a major community concern and the rise of Australian nationality increased the fever with which these memorials were built during the inter-war period.

The unveiling of the Allora Boer War Memorial on 19 August 1904 proclaimed a public holiday in the district, was carried out by Colonel (later General and Sir) Harry Chauvel. Chauvel is thought to be one of the most distinguished of Queensland soldiers. Memoirs written by him about his service in the Boer War indicate that he was interested in what he considered an English tradition of honouring fallen soldiers with memorials.

With the British race, more perhaps than with any other, the spirit of veneration for those who gave their lives for their country is very pronounced...This spirit was brought home to me immediately after the South African War when ...I toured the battlefields of Natal. I came across everywhere parties of British officers arranging to erect memorials...Incidentally these suggested to me the idea of erecting a memorial cairn on the first battlefield of my own regiment; with the result that there stands on a rocky kopje in the north of Cape Colony...the first Australian War Memorial erected on a battlefield.

Indeed, the speech with which Chauvel unveiled the Allora Memorial laments the fact that it was one of the very few memorials in Queensland erected at that time to commemorate the Boer War.

The base and pedestal of the Boer Memorial was constructed by Mr J McCulloch of Warwick, to designs of WP Prout. The Allora Boer War Memorial is thought to have cost about £134 which was raised by a committee formed for the memorial's construction. Sandstone used for the project was obtained from Mr Midson's Yangan quarry, near Warwick.

The digger statue was sculpted by William Priestly MacIntosh. Macintosh was a prominent sculptor who, after his arrival in Australia in 1880 from Edinburgh where he studied anatomy, began training in Sydney at modelling classes of Lucien Henry, and later life drawing classes with Julian Ashton. He undertook many architectural sculptures in Sydney from the 1890s, including work on the Queen Victoria Market. His arrival in Brisbane in 1903 was prompted by a commission for the sculpture on the Lands Administration Building, and shortly after this he carried out work for the Allora Boer Memorial. Other significant Queensland projects completed by Macintosh include figural sculpture on the former Government Savings Bank of 1920 and the various devils on the Queensland Government Printing Office completed in 1910–1911.

Immediately following the erection of the Boer War Memorial the committee who organised its erection thought it befitting to enhance the reserve in which the memorial stood, so that it might be considered a park. At this stage what then became known as the Memorial Park was bounded by the Creek and Raff Street. 120 trees were donated to the committee for the park by Mr McMahon, the curator of the Botanical Gardens in Brisbane and the Mayor of Allora also donated trees which were planted along Raff Street and became known as the 'Mayor's Row'. It is not known whether any of the trees donated by Mr McMahon or the Mayor of Allora remain extant today.

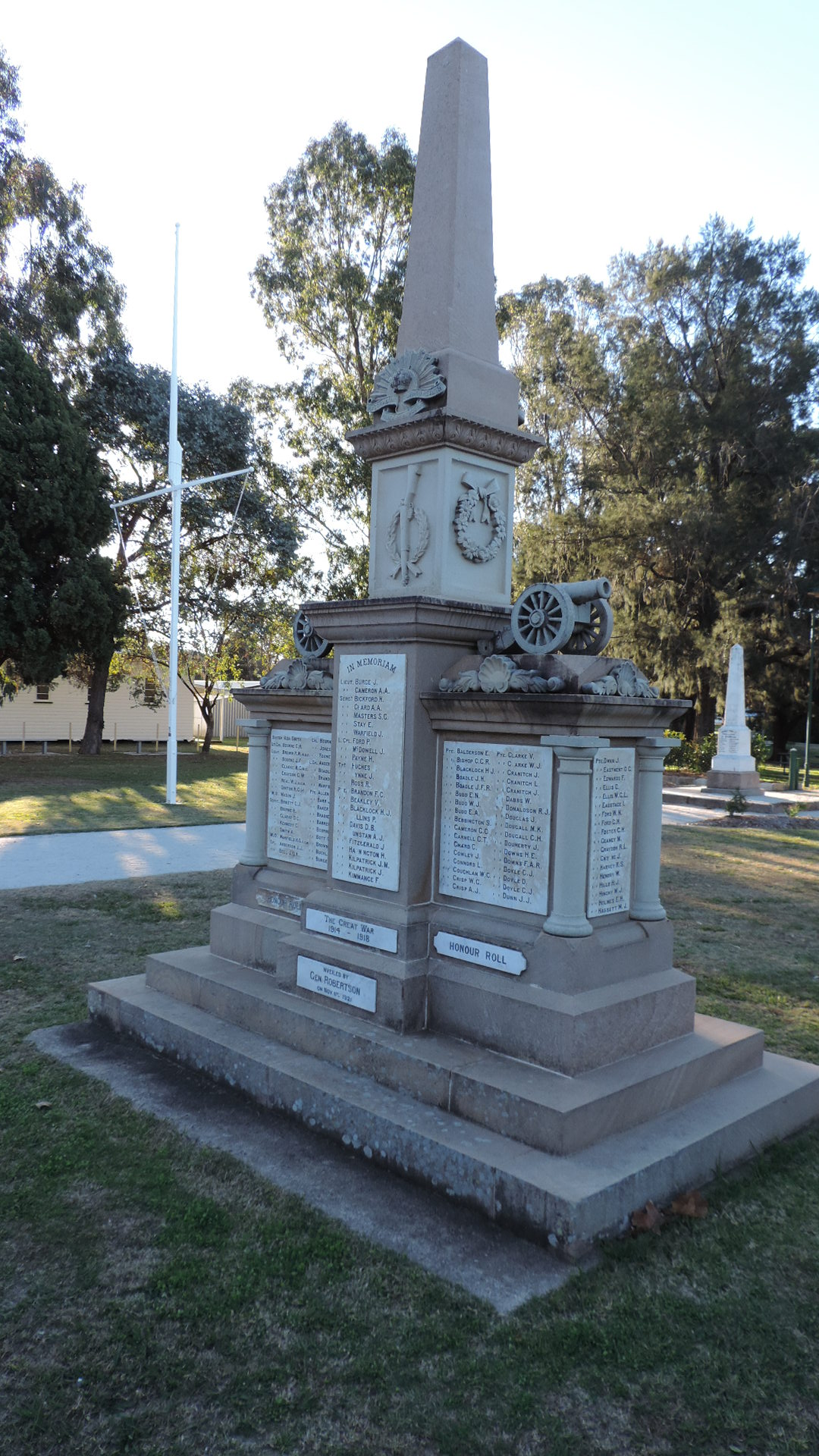
World War 1 memorial, Allora, 2015

A further addition was made to the park in 1921 when a World War I memorial was constructed. This was built in the form of an obelisk and is signed WJ Prout. Prout was a proprietor of the Brisbane Monumental Company who specialised in various types of monumental design and construction. This memorial was unveiled by General JC Robertson in mid November 1921.

A third memorial to fallen soldiers of World War Two was constructed in the form of an obelisk, with sandstone base and marble shaft.

== Description ==
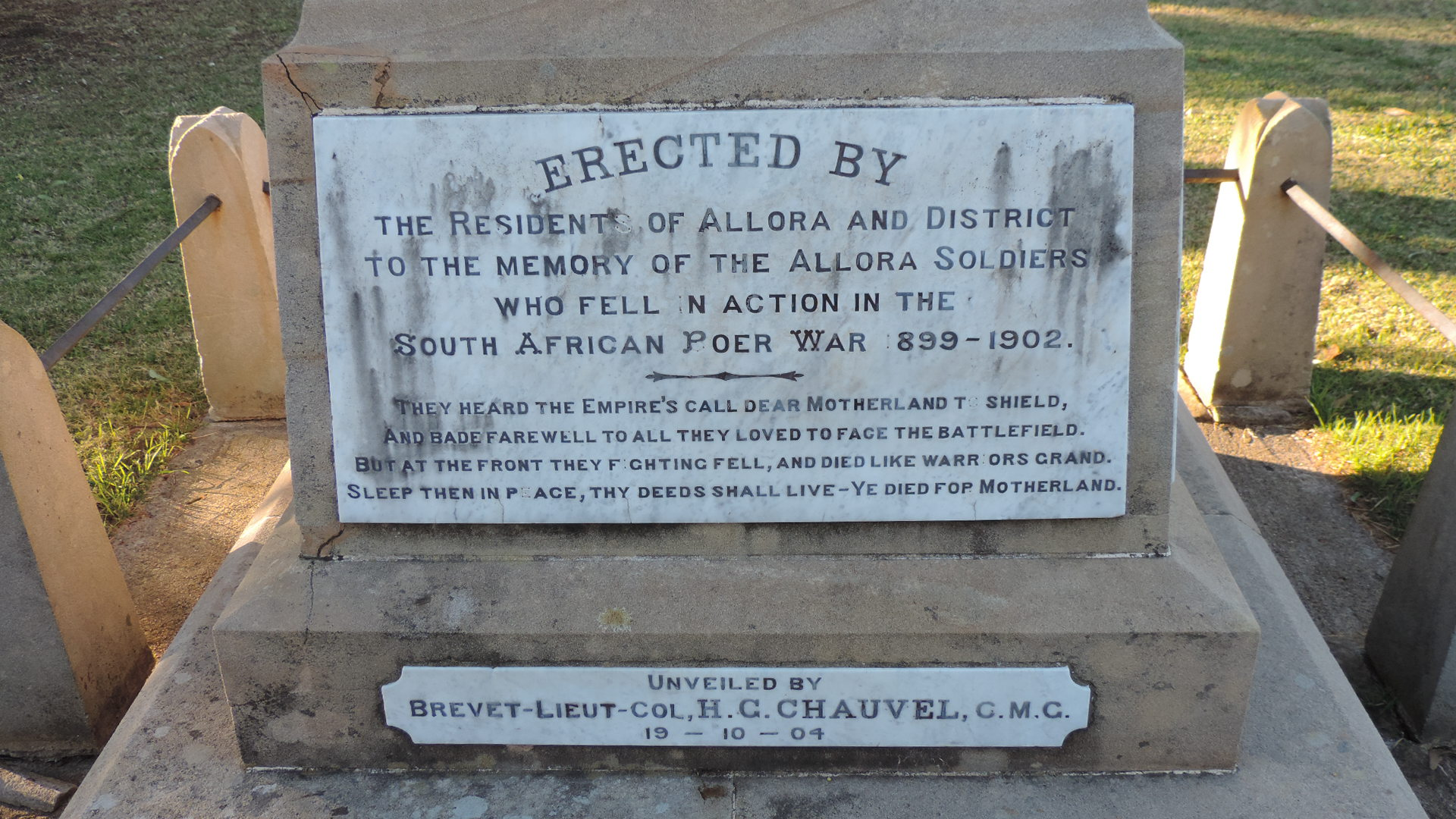
Plaque #1, Boer War Memorial, 2015

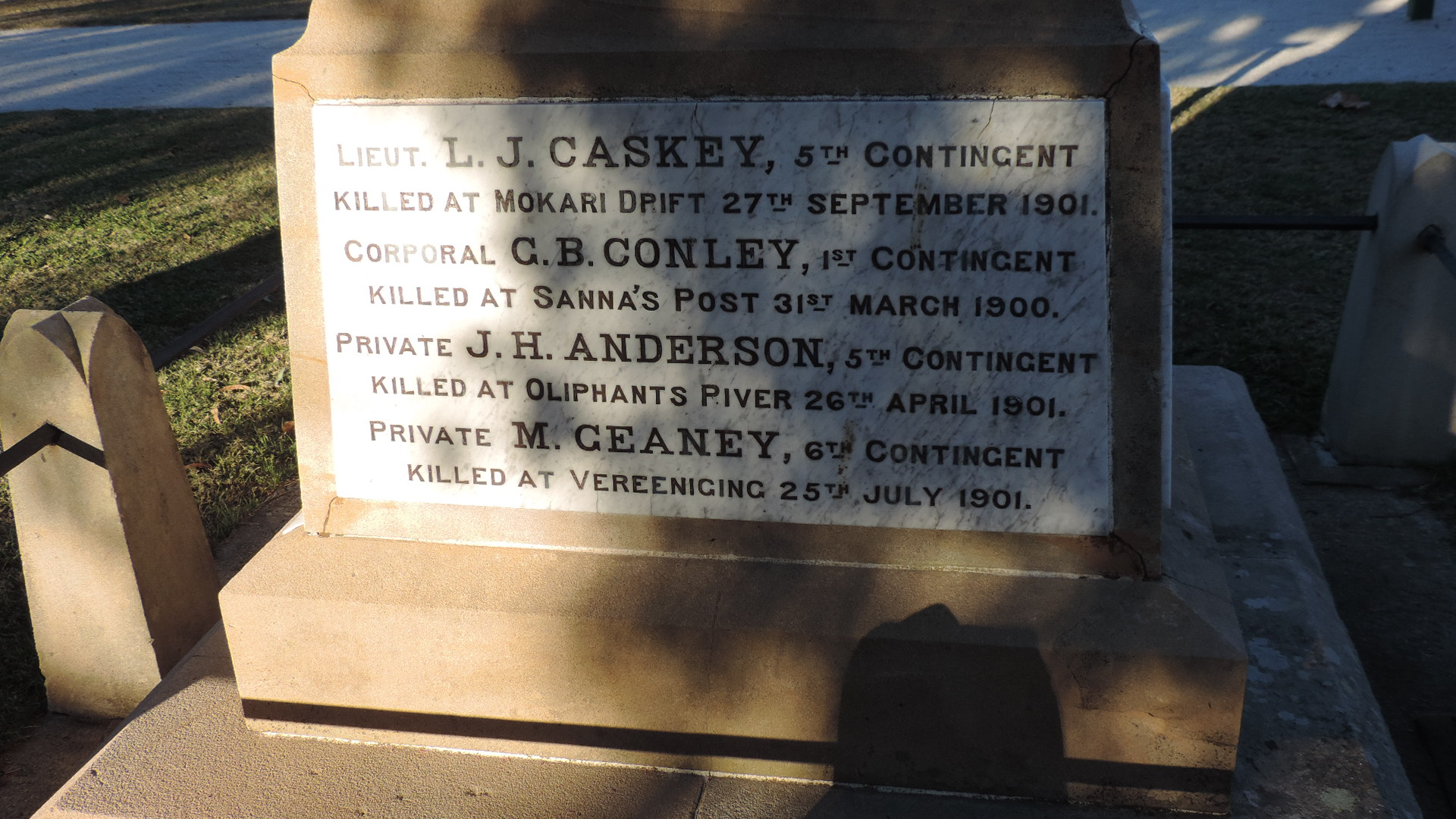
Plaque #2, Boer War Memorial, 2015

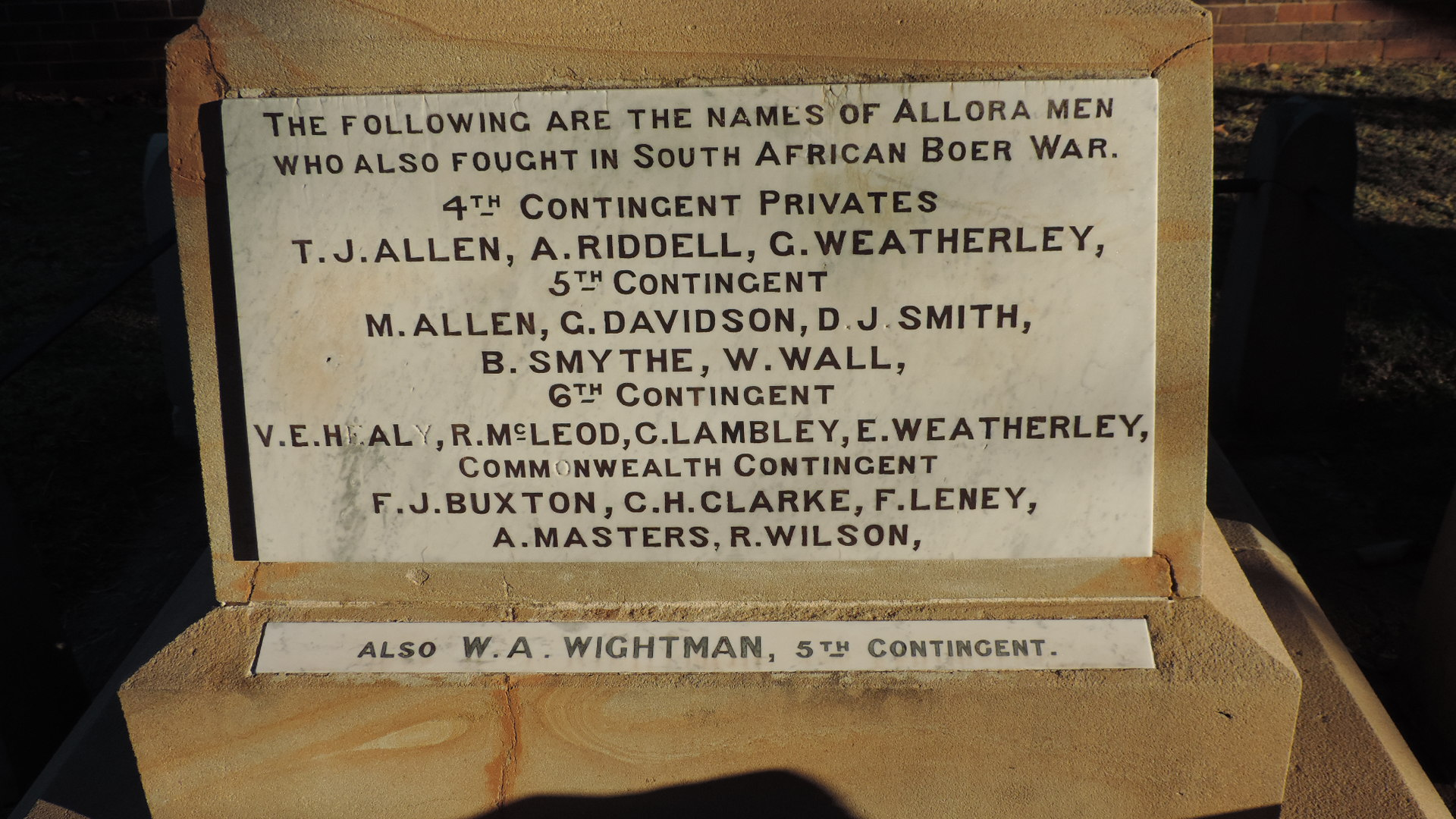
Plaque #3, Boer War Memorial, 2015

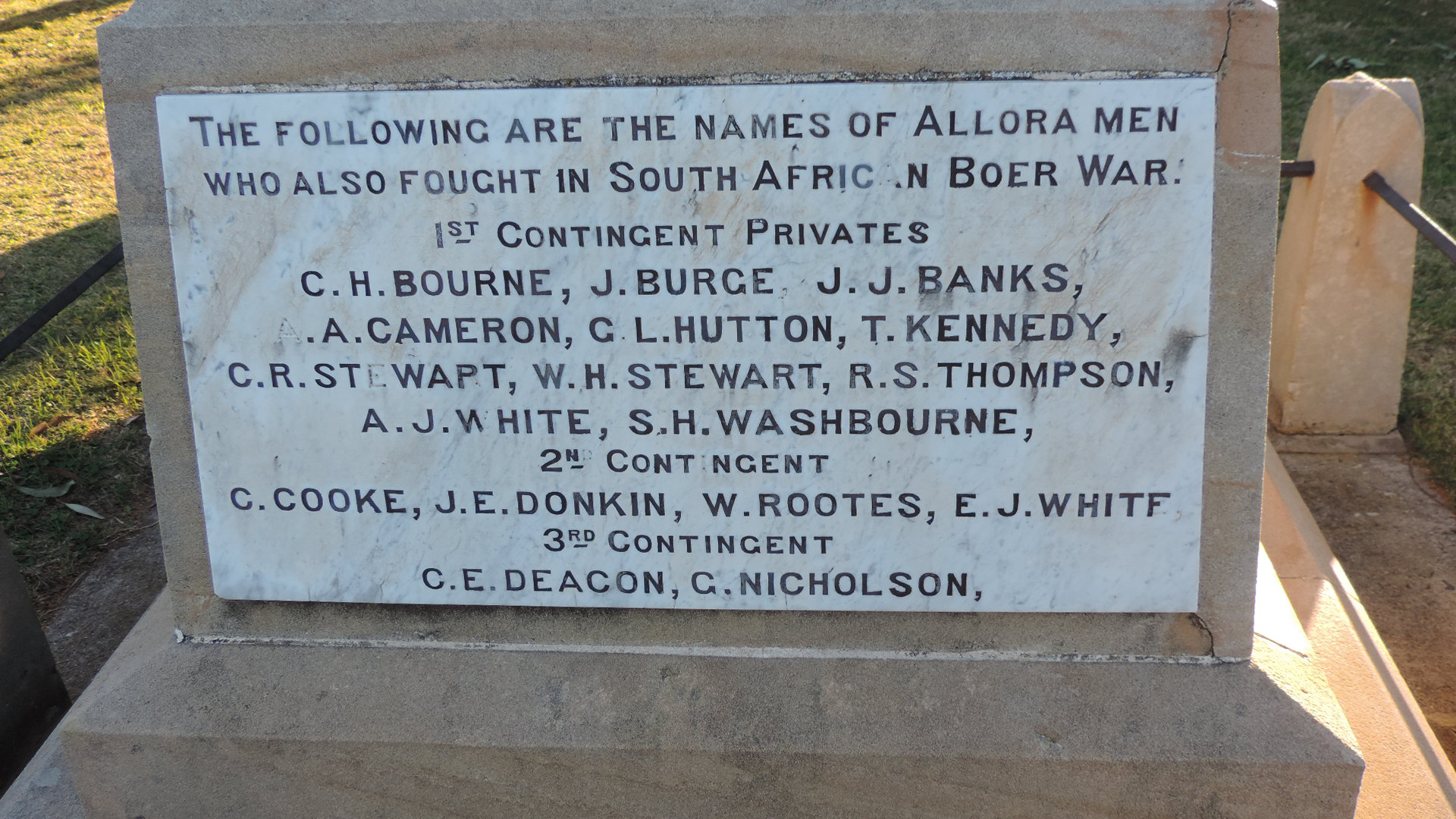
Plaque #4, Boer War Memorial, 2015

The Boer War Memorial is situated in a small park in Allora facing Warwick Street, in which memorials to the two World Wars are also found. The park is enclosed by a substantial brick and wrought iron fence along Warwick Street with a centrally placed gateway formed by brick newels with plaster finials and with an iron gate. The Boer and First World War memorials are towards the southern, Warwick Street side of the park and the Second World War Memorial is located toward the northern, rear of the park centrally placed between the others.

The Boer Memorial stands 15 feet (4.6 m) from the ground and comprises a pedestal surmounted by a digger statue. The memorial is surrounded by a low fence, consisting of evenly spaced bollards linked by steel rods.

The sandstone memorial sits on a base step with picked stone faces, margined and chiselled around. Surmounting this is a smooth faced stone step with plinth, on the faces of both of which are marble plaques with details of the opening of the statue and the names of the Allora men who took part in the war along with the names of the fallen with details of their death. The plinth supports the shaft of the memorial comprising a recessed square pier which features a wreath on the southern facing side and has a base element comprising a cyma recta moulding with foliated carving. Also projecting from this base at the four corners of the pedestal are free standing round columns with simple Doric order bases and capitals. These support a cornice with curved pediment detail above which on the southern side is carved ornament of foliated scrolls and a central anthemion element.

Surmounting the pedestal is the digger statue, which is slightly smaller than life size. The soldier stands to attention and with his head bowed his rifle reverse. Unusually for this type of statue the mouth of the soldier his open and he stands alone, without the traditional tree stump support. WP MACINTOSH is carved onto the side of the plate on which the soldier stands.

The World War One Memorial, again constructed largely from smooth faced sandstone and marble, comprises a three-part pedestal on the central part of which sits an obelisk. The central part of the pedestal projects from the flanking elements and the whole sits on a three stepped base. Simple round columns with Doric order bases and capitals are found on each corner of the pedestal. Small carved field guns are mounted on the side tops of the pedestal flanking the obelisk which rises from the centre. The obelisk comprises a square planned shaft with various mouldings on its faces above which is a cornice of a cyma recta moulding with foliated carving. Surmounted on this is the obelisk, of smooth faced sandstone; a tapering column with carved shields affixed to the north and south.

The World War Two Memorial, which sits to the rear of the park is a simple obelisk, with a base of two sandstone steps surmounted by two white marble steps the upper one with a simple carved moulding at the top on which sits the tall tapering column of white marble on the south side of which a wreath and gun are carved.

== Heritage listing ==
Boer War Memorial and Park was listed on the Queensland Heritage Register on 21 October 1992 having satisfied the following criteria.

The place is important in demonstrating the evolution or pattern of Queensland's history.

The Boer War Memorial is an immensely important Queensland sculpture. It is the first of only three digger statues built to commemorate the involvement and death of Queensland soldiers in the Boer War of 1899–1902. The memorial was constructed at an early phase of the history of war memorials in the state, which became prolific after the First World War but, in 1904 when the Allora Boer War Memorial was constructed were quite rare.

The place demonstrates rare, uncommon or endangered aspects of Queensland's cultural heritage.

The digger statue is uncommon in composition and detailing and is one of the only known memorials sculpted by Sydney sculptor WP Macintosh.

The place is important in demonstrating the principal characteristics of a particular class of cultural places.

The three memorials in the Memorial Park, Allora demonstrate the principal characteristics of war memorials in Queensland with appropriately use of various symbolic elements.

The place is important because of its aesthetic significance.

The Boer War and World War I Memorials are of aesthetic significance both individually and as complementary sculptures with common ornamental and compositional detailing.

The place has a strong or special association with a particular community or cultural group for social, cultural or spiritual reasons.

The Memorial Park has special importance for the community commemorating local involvement in the major wars of this century.

The place has a special association with the life or work of a particular person, group or organisation of importance in Queensland's history.

The memorials have special association with various people of importance to Queensland including Sir Harry Chauvel who unveiled the Boer War Memorial; William Macintosh who carved the digger and was responsible for much significant architectural sculpture on various Queensland Government buildings; as well as to all the soldiers mentioned on the memorials.
