= William Priestly MacIntosh =

Australian sculptor (1857–1930)

William Priestly MacIntosh (1857 – 9 January 1930) was a sculptor in Sydney, Australia. His works often decorated significant public buildings in Sydney, Brisbane, Canberra and major provincial centres. Many of them are now heritage-listed.

== Early life ==
MacIntosh was born near Ayr in Scotland in 1857 and died in Sydney in 1930. Before immigrating to New South Wales in 1880, he studied anatomy and sculpture in Edinburgh. By 1896 MacIntosh was "executing every kind of sculpture", working from a yard in Hereford Street, Forest Lodge. He was still actively working at the time of his death at his residence and studio in Kogarah.

== Works ==
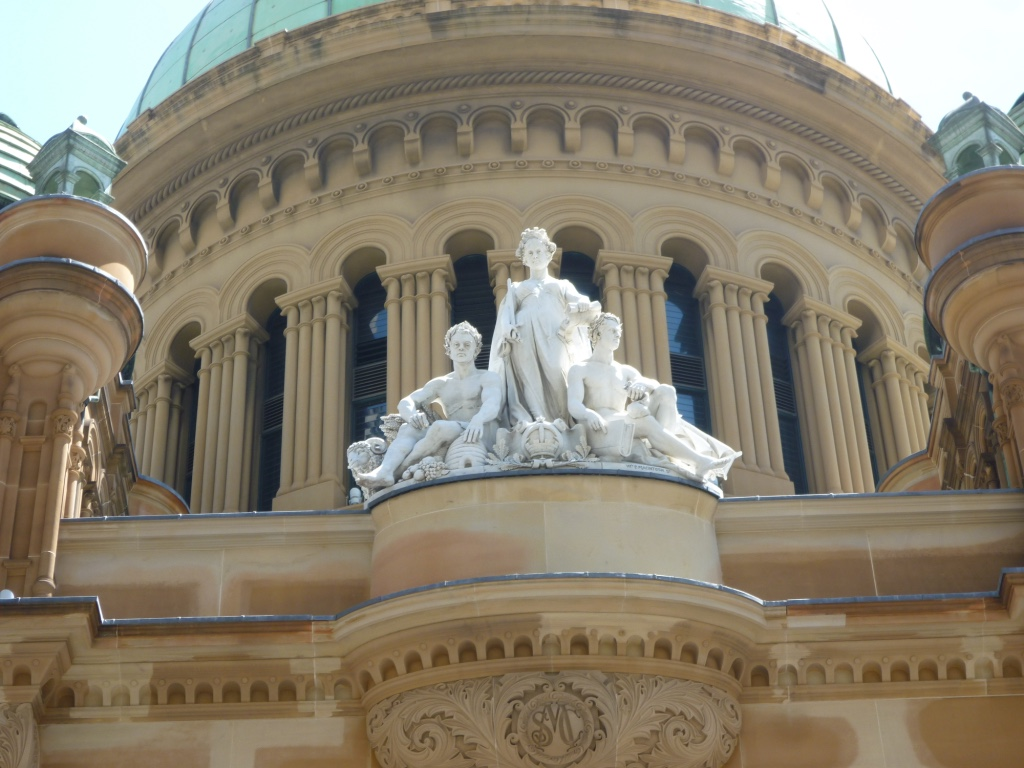
Guardian Genius of the City
above George St. entrance (QVB)

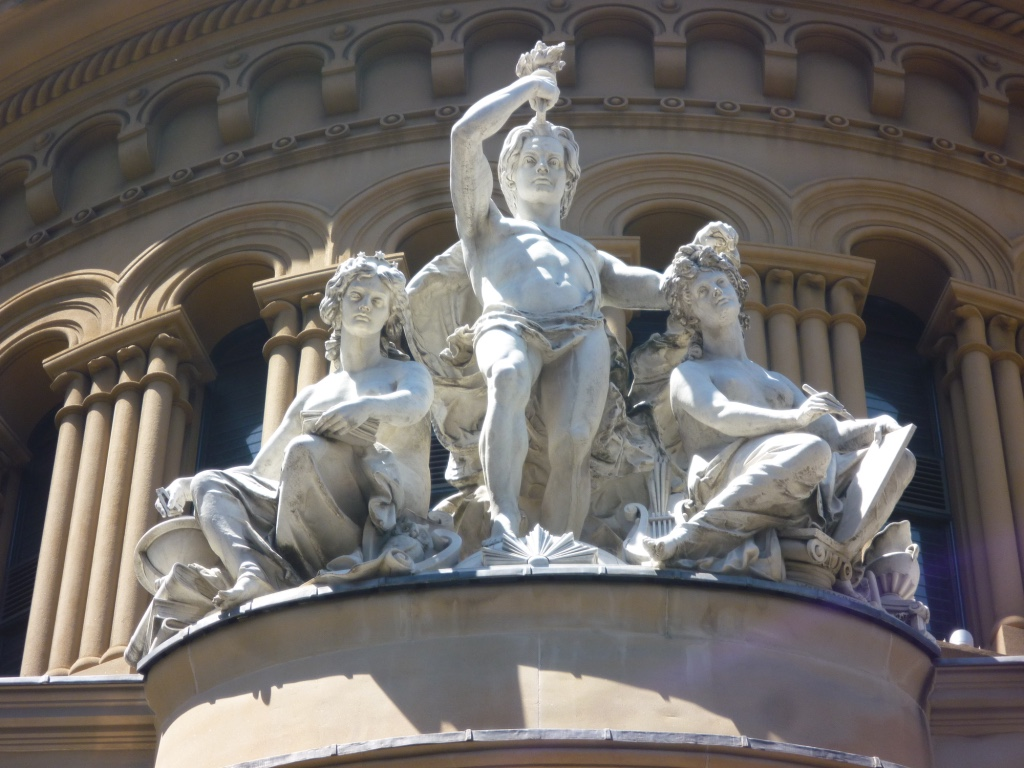
Guardian Genius of Civilisation
above York St. entrance (QVB)

Description of George Street group

Standing upon a raised pedestal in the centre is a female figure lightly draped in flowing robes, representing the "Guardian Genius of the City", with the symbol of Wisdom in one hand and Justice in the other. She is crowned with the civic crown and waratah wreath. At her feet is a shield bearing the city crest. On her right is seated a semi-nude, muscular, male figure, representing Labor and Industry, with the appropriate symbols, viz., wheat, a ram, fruit, and a beehive, grouped round him. On her left is a corresponding male figure representing Commerce and Exchange. A ship in full sail is shown on his left. A bag of money its in one of his hands, and the ledger book in the other. Both figures are wreathed with olive, the symbol of Peace.

Description of York Street group

The central figure, a vigorous youth representing civilisation holds aloft the torch to better guide science and the arts and crafts represented by two beautiful semi-nude girls. Science has a compass and is checking some facts stated on a scroll she holds in her left hand. She is in deep thought in fine contrast to her sister representing Arts And Crafts who is looking with a welcoming and pleading look as if she is asking you to permit her to picture you.

His works include:

- Lands Department building, Sydney (1890–1891)
- Sydney Technical College, Sydney (1891)
- Queen Victoria Building, Sydney (1898–1899)
- Land Administration Building, Brisbane (1903–1904)
- Boer War Memorial, Allora, Queensland (1904)
- Queensland Government Printing Office, Brisbane (1910)
- Australian Mutual Provident Society head office, Sydney (1912)
- Commonwealth Bank building, Sydney (1916)
- Family Services Building, Brisbane (1920)
- Old Parliament House, Canberra (1926)
