= Tomaszówka =

Tomaszówka may refer to the following places:

- Tomaszówka, Chełm County in Lublin Voivodeship (east Poland)
- Tomaszówka, Lublin County in Lublin Voivodeship (east Poland)
- Tomaszówka, Zamość County in Lublin Voivodeship (east Poland)
- Tomaszówka, Lipsko County in Masovian Voivodeship (east-central Poland)
