= Tomaszew =

Tomaszew may refer to the following places:

- Tomaszew, Koło County in Greater Poland Voivodeship (central Poland)
- Tomaszew, Konin County in Greater Poland Voivodeship (central Poland)
- Tomaszew, Masovian Voivodeship (east-central Poland)
