= Abundance (economics) =

#REDIRECT Post-scarcity

- From a page move: This is a redirect from a page that has been moved (renamed). This page was kept as a redirect to avoid breaking links, both internal and external, that may have been made to the old page name.
