= Tomaszewo =

Tomaszewo may refer to:

- Tomaszewo, Aleksandrów County in Kuyavian-Pomeranian Voivodeship (north-central Poland)
- Tomaszewo, Brodnica County in Kuyavian-Pomeranian Voivodeship (north-central Poland)
- Tomaszewo, Lipno County in Kuyavian-Pomeranian Voivodeship (north-central Poland)
- Tomaszewo, Mogilno County in Kuyavian-Pomeranian Voivodeship (north-central Poland)
- Tomaszewo, Masovian Voivodeship (east-central Poland)
- Tomaszewo, Konin County in Greater Poland Voivodeship (west-central Poland)
- Tomaszewo, Piła County in Greater Poland Voivodeship (west-central Poland)
- Tomaszewo, Słupca County in Greater Poland Voivodeship (west-central Poland)
- Tomaszewo, Szamotuły County in Greater Poland Voivodeship (west-central Poland)
- Tomaszewo, Kościerzyna County in Pomeranian Voivodeship (north Poland)
- Tomaszewo, Starogard County in Pomeranian Voivodeship (north Poland)
- Tomaszewo, Warmian-Masurian Voivodeship (north Poland)
