= Australian Mutual Provident Society head office, Sydney =

Coordinates: 33.8649°S 151.2085°E

AMP Society Head Office
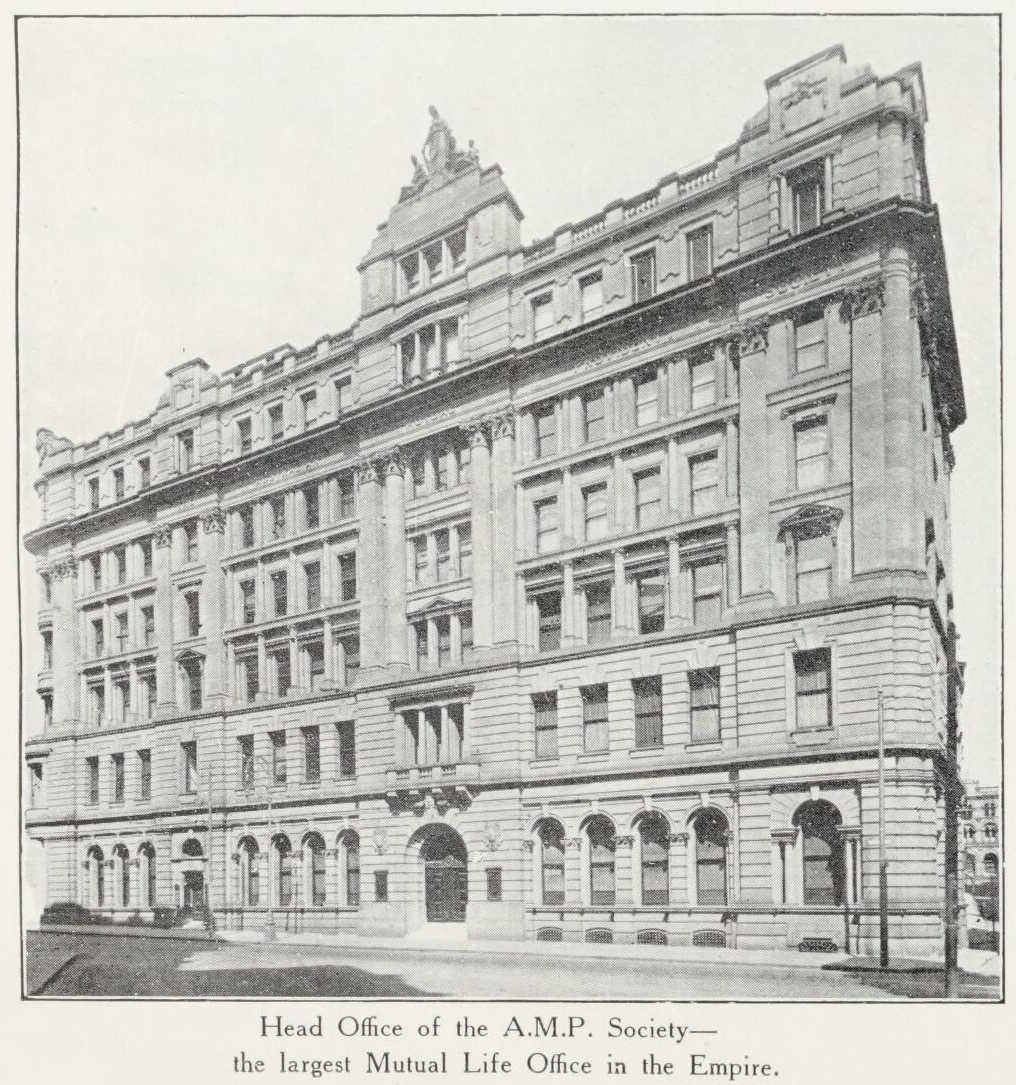
- The AMP head office pictured in 1932.
- Interactive map of the AMP Society Head Office area

General information
- Type: Office building
- Architectural style: Victorian mannerist (1878); Federation Free Classical (1912)
- Location: 87 Pitt Street, Sydney, New South Wales, Australia
- Construction started: 1877; 1909
- Completed: 1878; 1912
- Opening: 1878; 1913
- Demolished: 1962
- Client: Australian Mutual Provident Society

Height
- Roof: 40.84 m (134.0 ft)

Technical details
- Floor count: 6

Design and construction
- Architects: Mansfield Brothers (1878); Ernest Alfred Scott (1912); J. Kirkpatrick & Son (1918)
- Main contractor: Aaron Loveridge & Hugh McMaster (1878); F. E. Munro (1912/1918)

The Australian Mutual Provident Society Head Office was a landmark office building at 87 Pitt Street, bounded by Bond Street and Curtin Place in the central business district of Sydney. The first AMP head office building on this site was completed in 1878 and designed in the renaissance mannerist style by George Allen Mansfield. This building was substantially rebuilt and expanded in 1909–1912 in the Free Classical style by Ernest Alfred Scott. This building was the head office of the Australian Mutual Provident Society from 1878 until 1962, when the new AMP Building at Circular Quay was completed. The former head office building was demolished in September 1962 to make way for the landmark modernist Australia Square development by Lend Lease/Civil & Civic and designed by Harry Seidler.

== History ==
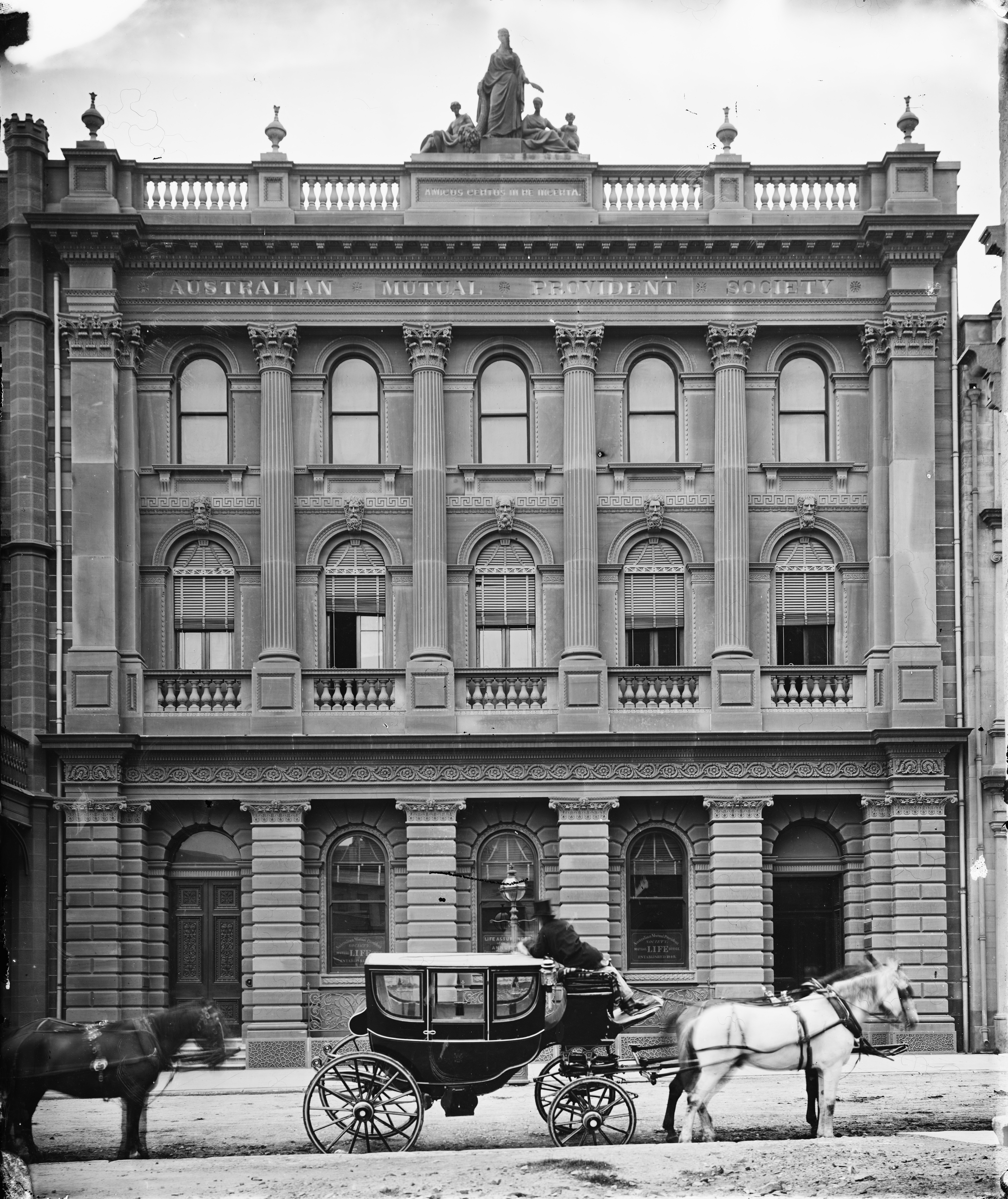
The AMP Society building at 98 Pitt Street (1864–1878), designed by Reed and Barnes.

=== Early premises, 1849–1878 ===
When the Australian Mutual Provident Society commenced business in Sydney in the Colony of New South Wales in 1849, its first premises were located at 314 George Street. However, the growing business of the society meant that it changed premises multiple times in its early years. In 1864, the AMP Society commissioned a new principal office on the eastern side of Pitt Street (No. 98), on a site that now contains Wales House, which was designed by Melbourne architects Reed and Barnes (supervised by Edmund Blacket). The AMP 'Amicus' group that depicts "Australia receiving the Gifts of Peace and Plenty" atop this new building was sculpted in sandstone by Charles Summers.

=== Mansfield building, 1878–1909 ===
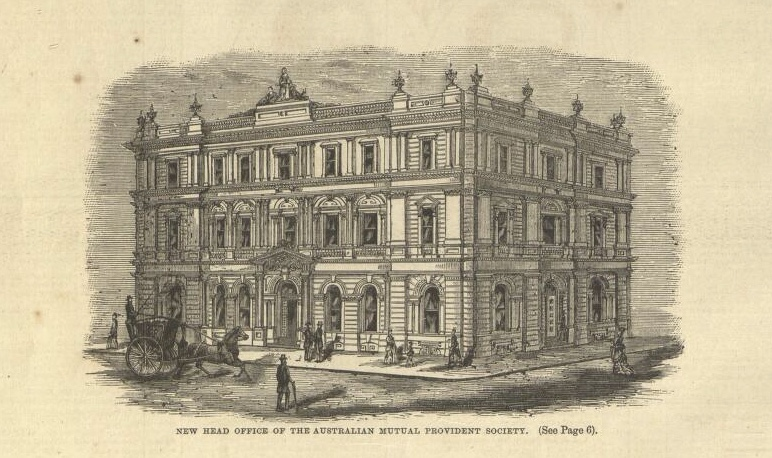
Lithograph of the 1878 AMP Head Office, designed by Mansfield Brothers, as published in The Bulletin.

By 1875, the AMP Society board resolved to build a new larger head office on a site opposite the current offices at 87 Pitt Street, with designs in the Mannerist style prepared by Mansfield Brothers, and a tender for the construction of the basement and foundations from Aaron Loveridge was accepted in March 1875.

The foundation stone of this new head office was laid on 23 January 1877 by the AMP Society chairman, John Smith, with the main building construction tender undertaken by Hugh McMaster. The new building of three storeys and a basement had a façade built in sandstone quarried from Pyrmont and ironwork supplied by Mort's Dock and Engineering Company. The building was completed in 1878 and the first meeting of the AMP Society members in the new head office was held on 30 September 1879.

=== Extension and expansion, 1909–1918 ===
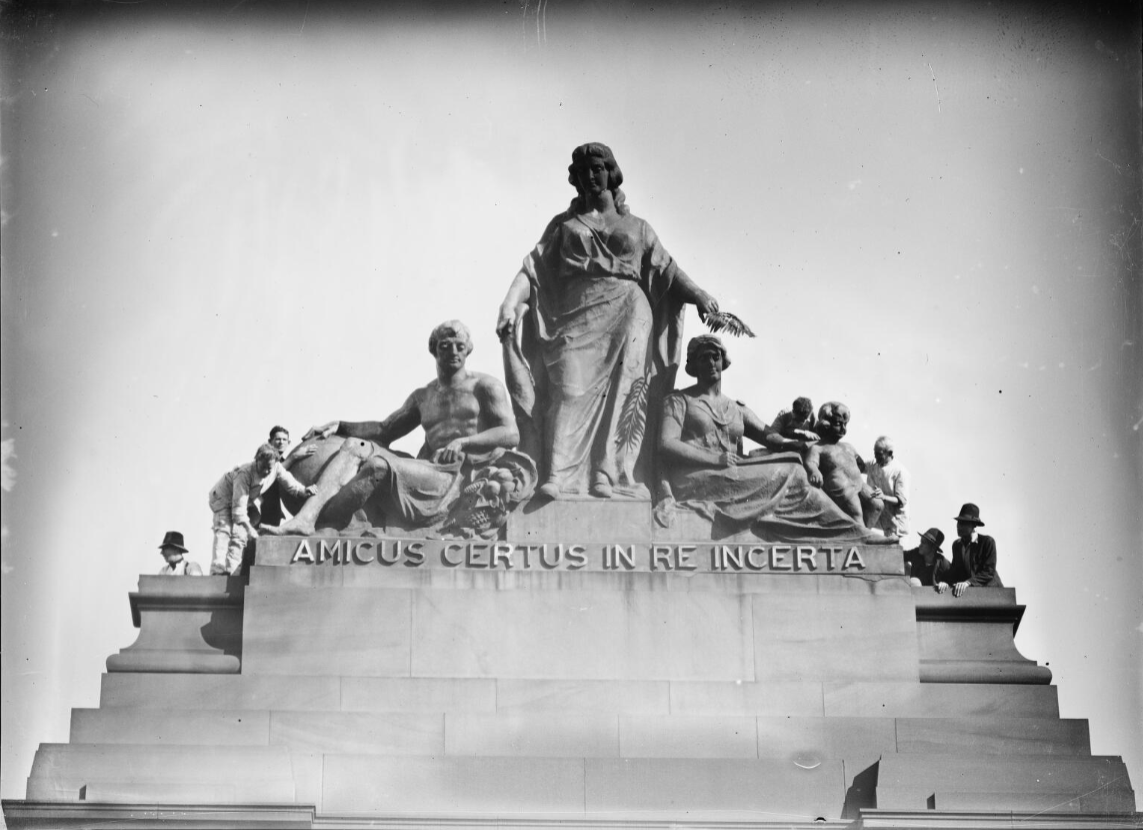
The 1912 Amicus statue by William Priestly MacIntosh on top of the AMP Head Office.

By 1909, the AMP Society found the current premises inadequate for its expanding business, and commissioned significant extensions to have six storeys above the street level and a full redesign of the existing premises on Pitt Street in a more restrained Free Classical style at a cost of £62,770. The president of the NSW Institute of Architects, Ernest Alfred Scott of Scott & Green, was the architect, and Finlay Elgin Munro was the master builder. The old 'Amicus' sculptural group by Charles Summers was determined to be too small in scale for the new offices and "fell to pieces" when it was removed, so the AMP Board commissioned a new 'Amicus' group sculpted by William Priestly MacIntosh to be placed atop the renewed headquarters. The new offices were completed in late 1912, and were officially opened by the Governor of New South Wales, Lord Chelmsford, on 21 January 1913.

In order to accommodate future growth, AMP Society acquired adjoining sites to the south of the offices up to Little George Street (now known as Curtin Place), and commissioned further extensions in March 1916 designed in the same classical style by architects John Kirkpatrick & Son, who won the contract in a public competition. The foundation for the extensions was laid by the AMP chairman, Sir Alfred Meeks, on 28 April 1917, and the construction was undertaken by Finlay Munro. Completed in 1918, the extensions featured a circular corner facing the corner of Pitt and Little George streets. These additions were savaged in Building, which noted that "it is a pity that such a graceful, correctly designed and handsomely executed facade should have tacked on to it as its most prominent feature such miserable substitute for architecture."

== Demolition ==
By the middle of the 20th century, the now-historic head office appeared outdated and insufficient to the needs of the AMP. In a 1938 profile of the building published in Construction it was praised as a "delightful composition...the embodiment of dignity and architectural grace" but that its days may be numbered: "These big companies are so frequently pulling their buildings down and re-building, it makes one wonder how long this one will last". In 1956, the AMP Society acquired a new site at Circular Quay fronting Alfred Street, and entered into negotiations for a new landmark modernist office tower to serve as the new head office, with a height that would breach the 150-foot height limit for buildings in the City of Sydney. Approval for the new AMP Building was granted in 1959, and the AMP offices moved to the new building on its completion in 1961–1962. The AMP Society then sold the building and its land to developer Lend Lease, which was intending to demolish it and surrounding buildings for the Australia Square development. At this time an article in the Sydney Morning Herald, noted that the AMP Building was one of many sandstone landmarks in Sydney under threat as the fashion in architecture moved towards glass and steel away from stone. The demolition of the former AMP Head Office was completed by late 1962, and the construction of Australia Square by Civil & Civic to a design by Harry Seidler commenced in December 1962.
