= AMP Limited =

Financial services company in Australia and New Zealand

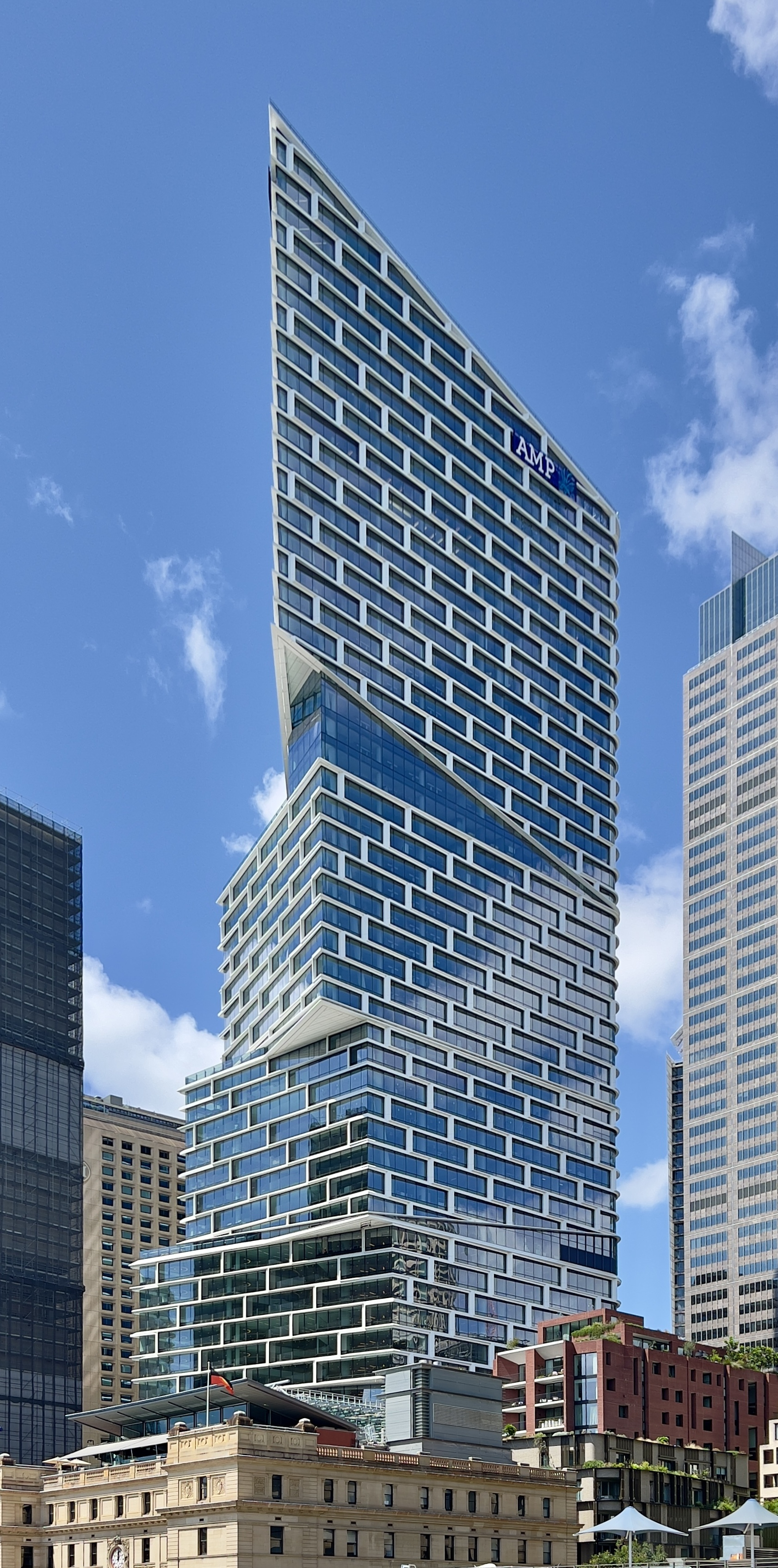
- The AMP's headquarters at Quay Quarter Tower, Sydney
- Type: Public
- Traded as: ASX: AMP
- Industry: Financial services
- Founded: 1 January 1849; 177 years ago
- Headquarters: Quay Quarter Tower, Sydney, Australia
- Area served: Australia and New Zealand
- Key people: Mike Hirst (chairperson); Blair Vernon (CEO)
- Products: Superannuation and investment products, financial advice, banking services and investment management
- Revenue: ▼ A$1.287 billion (2025); A$1.252 billion (2024)
- Operating income: ▲ A$377 million (2025); A$310 million (2024)
- Net income: ▼ A$133 million (2025); A$150 million (2024)
- Total assets: ▼ A$34.212 billion (2025); A$33.161 billion (2024)
- Total equity: ▼ A$3.744 billion (2025); A$3.652 billion (2024)
- Number of employees: 2275 (2025)
- Divisions: Platforms; Super & Investments; AMP Bank; New Zealand Wealth Management
- Subsidiaries: AMP Bank Limited; AMP Financial Investment Group Holdings Limited; N.M. Superannuation Proprietary Limited; AWM Services Pty Ltd
- Website: www.amp.com.au

AMP Limited (formerly Australian Mutual Provident Society) is an Australian financial services company that operates in Australia and New Zealand. It offers superannuation and investment products and banking services through AMP Banking, including home loans and savings accounts. AMP is headquartered in Sydney, Australia.

AMP has one of Australia's largest shareholder registers, with most shareholders living in Australia due to all policy holders receiving shares in the new company when the society demutualised.

== History ==
=== 1848 to 1998 ===
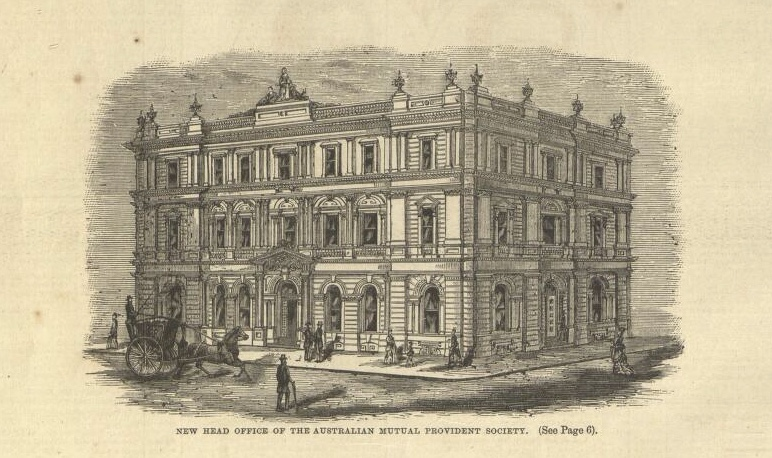
Australian Mutual Provident Society head office, Sydney, 1878.

On 31 August 1848, a group of businessmen, including Thomas Holt Jnr, Thomas Sutcliffe Mort, and William Perry, met to form an organisation to provide life assurance to Australians, leading to the establishment of the Australian Mutual Provident Society (AMP). Life expectancy at the time was low, and risks like disease and accidents were common. As a mutual society, AMP raised no initial capital and had no shareholders, relying on its members. The society's goal was to provide financial security for families through life insurance and annuities. AMP's rules were registered on 28 December 1848 under the Friendly Societies Act of New South Wales.

David Jones was a foundation director in 1848.

The Australian Mutual Provident Society was formed in 1849 as a non-profit, life-insurance company, and mutual society. George King was chairman for fifteen years from the 1850s. Richard Teece was general manager and actuary from 1890 and a director from 1917 to 1927.

AMP began operations on 1 January 1849 at 470 George Street, Sydney, in a small upstairs office. Due to uncertain business, the office was open just 1-2 hours daily. The first policy was issued on 25 February 1849 to AMP's secretary, William Perry, marking the first policy from an Australian insurance company.

AMP expanded by recruiting local agents across New South Wales, Queensland, and Victoria. Initially, most policies were sold to AMP's own members, with the first external policies issued in March 1849. The company faced challenges educating the public on insurance and annuities, but by April 1851, AMP reached 100 policies.

In the 1850s, AMP expanded with agents in Auckland and Hobart. Perry, a key figure in AMP’s early success, died in 1855. The company provided support to his widow and children in recognition of his contributions.

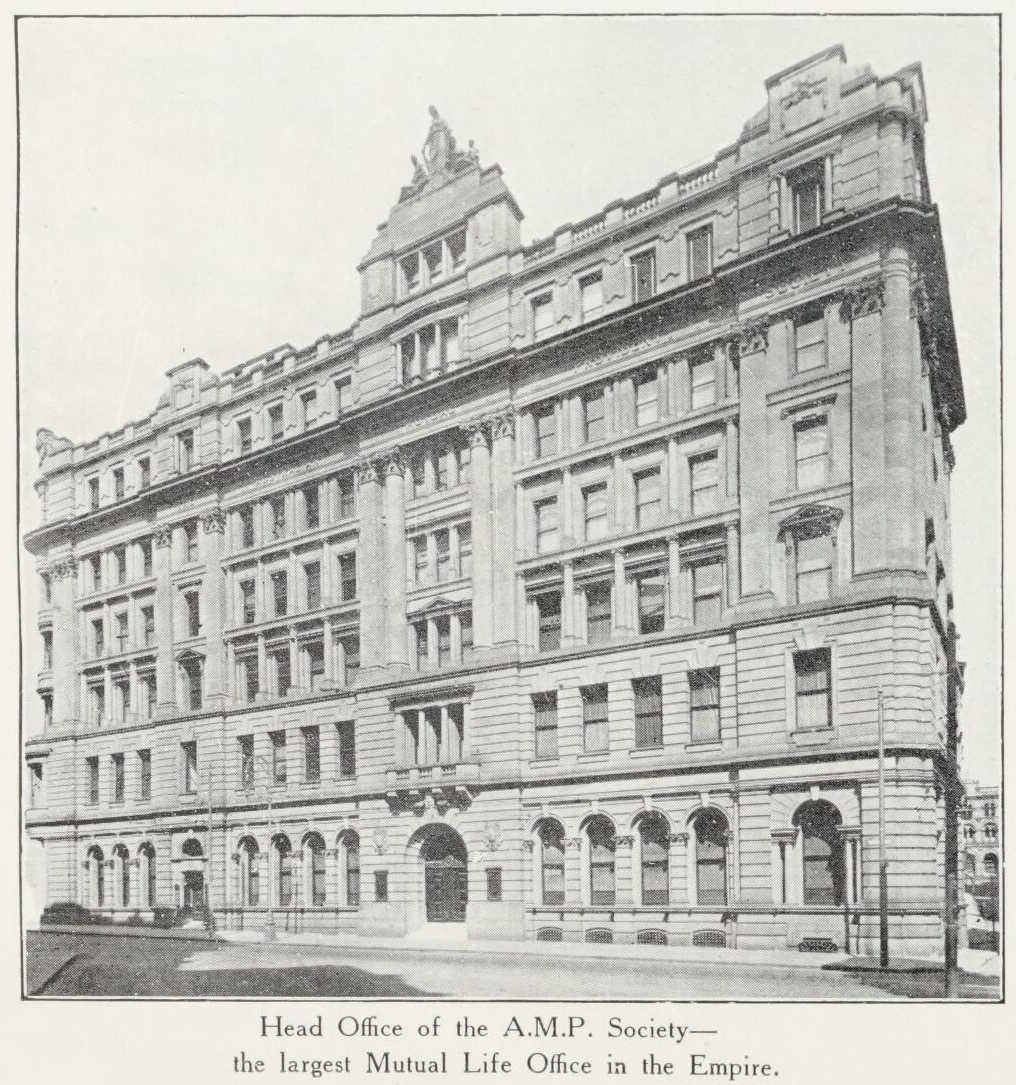
The AMP's second head office in Sydney, 1932

In 1876, the first New Zealand AMP centre was built in Wellington. In 1910, AMP became the first company to provide assurance to soldiers. In 1960, AMP opened its Auckland office.

1976 the Quay Quarter Tower in Sydney, one of the biggest skyscrapers in the city, was initially built as the AMP centre.

In 1989, it acquired the London Life Association.

In 1998, AMP was demutualised into an Australian public company, AMP Limited, and listed on the Australian Securities Exchange and New Zealand Stock Exchange. In 1999, AMP launched AMP Banking, an online bank. In 2003, the company demerged its UK operations, creating the Henderson Group.

AMP headquarters moved to the AMP Building on Alfred Street in 2018, although the Tower is still owned by AMP Capital

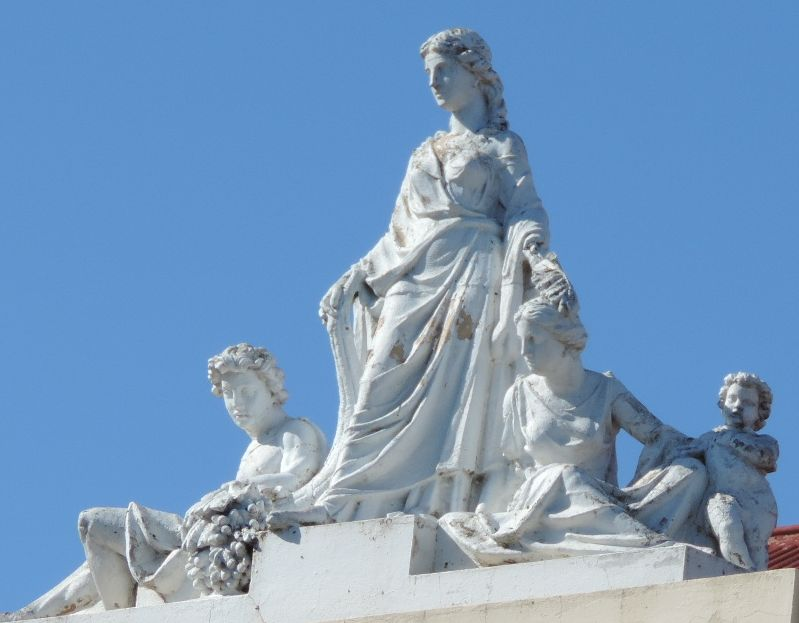
"Amicus" statue group on the AMP Building in Warwick

Many of the older AMP buildings in Australia are now heritage-listed and feature the "Amicus" statue group. The central figure in the statue group is the goddess of Peace and Plenty, holding a palm branch (signifying peace) and a cornucopia (symbolising plenty). The male figure of Labour sits to her left and also holds the cornucopia, while the figures of the wife and the child sit on the goddess's right under her palm branch. Under the statue is AMP Society's Latin motto "Amicus certus in re incerta" ("A certain friend in uncertain times"). The importance of Amicus was also demonstrated through the ultimate award bestowed upon AMP's highest achieving advisers, Amicus membership.

=== 1998-2019 ===
In 2003, the company demerged its UK operations, creating the Henderson Group.

On 15 November 2010, AMP announced a bid to merge its business with AXA Asia Pacific Holdings. The transaction was a joint proposal with Axa under which Axa would acquire Axa Asia Pacific Holdings's Asian business' and AMP would acquire AXA's Australian and New Zealand business.

The Australasian holdings included the former National Mutual business (established in 1869) which was demutualised in 1996. AXA had gained majority ownership of National Mutual in 1999 and renamed the company as AXA Asia Pacific.

The first day of the merged group operating together was 31 March 2011, with the companies to be gradually integrated and the AXA brand being phased out of the Australian and New Zealand market by 2013.

On 20 April 2018 Craig Meller resigned as CEO after it was revealed in the Royal Commission into Misconduct in the Banking, Superannuation and Financial Services Industry that AMP charged clients for financial advice which was not provided, and misled the Australian Securities & Investments Commission on numerous occasions. More than $1 billion in market value was stripped from AMP shares as news of the company's failings were revealed before the Royal Commission. In the wake of revelations at the banking royal commission and his resignation from AMP, Meller resigned as a financial services adviser to the Turnbull government.

On 30 April 2018, Catherine Brenner resigned as chairperson with Mike Wilkins appointed acting CEO and chairperson.

On 8 May 2018, directors Vanessa Wallace and Holly Kramer announced they would not be seeking re-election, in response to an imminent protest vote organised by the shareholders in the aftermath of the Banking Royal Commission. Patty Akopiantz also announced she would be resigning at the end of the year.

In November 2018, AMP admitted to a second overcharging scandal. and on 1 December 2018 the board appointed Franceso De Ferrari as the new Chief Executive Officer

=== 2019 - Present ===
In 2019, CEO Francesco De Ferrari launched a billion dollar transformation plan, aiming to recalibrate public opinion on AMP post royal commission.

In July 2020, AMP completed the sale of its life insurance business, AMP Life, to Resolution Life as part of a broader strategy to simplify the group and focus on its core banking and wealth management businesses.

On 25 March 2021, it was announced that De Ferrari would resign. In 2021, he was replaced by Alexis George, formerly of ANZ.

In July 2021, the Australian Securities & Investments Commission launched a case against AMP in the Federal Court, seeking pecuniary penalties and orders to publish an apology over the 'fee for no service' scandal, where the company would deduct a fee from client's accounts without performing a service. In September 2022, AMP was fined $14.6 million by the Federal Court. AMP had, as of August 2022, paid back $627 million to 331,994 customers affected by the scandal.

In February 2022, AMP delisted from the NZX, consolidating its listing on the Australian Securities Exchange.

In April 2022, AMP announced it would sell the real estate and domestic infrastructure equity business of its investment management subsidiary AMP Capital to Dexus.. In February 2023, DigitalBridge completed an acquisition of AMP Capital's remaining international infrastructure equity business for $316 million and renamed the unit InfraBridge.

In December 2024, AMP completed the sale of its financial advice businesses, including AMP Financial Planning, Hillross and Charter Financial Planning, and its Jigsaw advice services business, to Entireti.

In January 2026, AMP announced the appointment of Blair Vernon as Group Chief Executive Officer, succeeding Alexis George, with his appointment taking effect on 30 March 2026.

== Operations ==
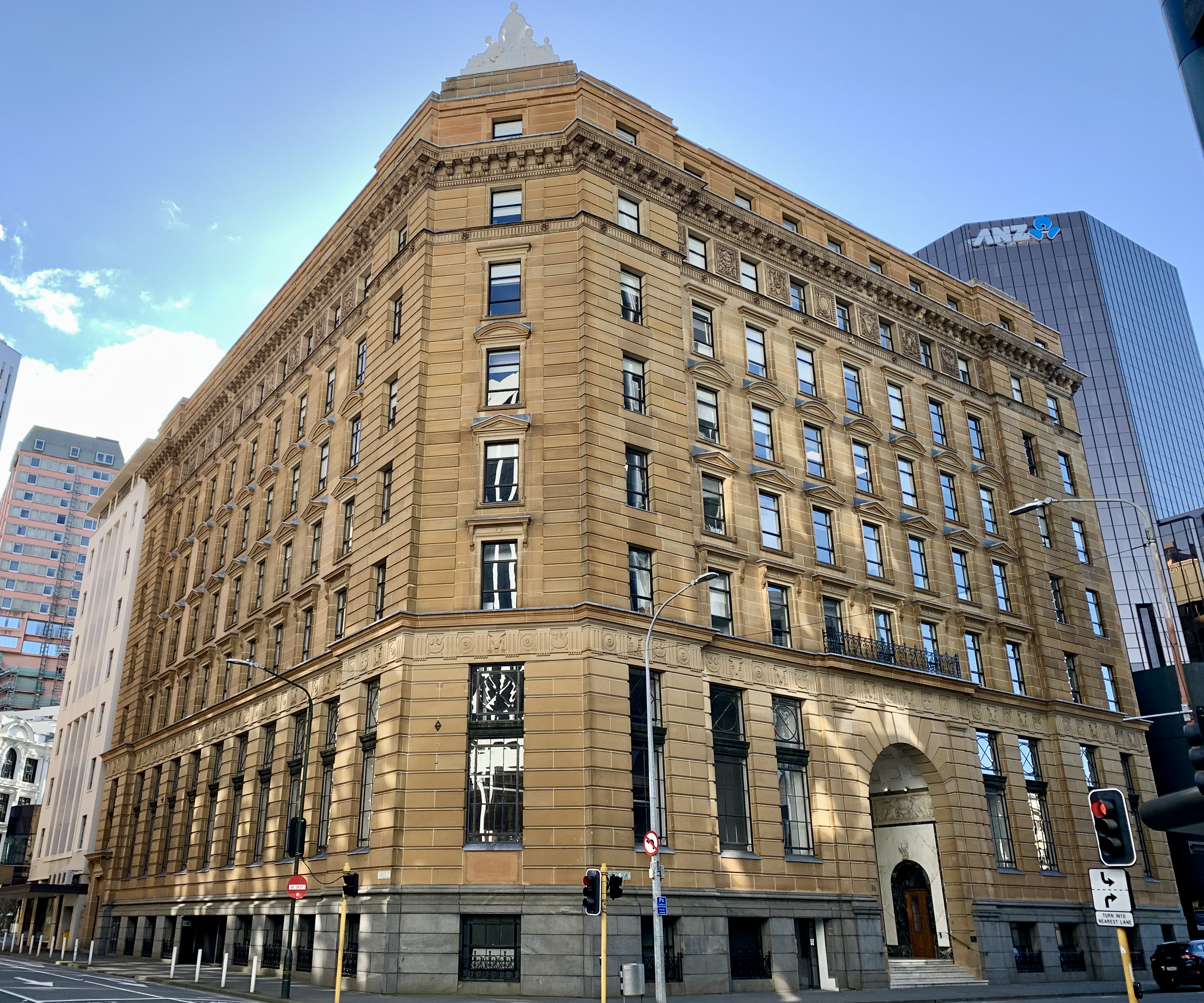
AMP Building, Wellington

AMP has the following business areas:

- Platforms, which includes wrap investment platform North, is primarily used by financial advisers to help manage their clients' investments and retirement savings.
- AMP Bank, which provides selected banking products, including home loans. The division includes AMP Bank GO, launched in 2025 to provide everyday banking services and savings accounts.
- Superannuation and Investments, which provides superannuation and accompanying support services, such as digital financial advice. AMP was granted a MySuper authority, enabling it to receive default superannuation contributions from 1 January 2014.
- New Zealand Wealth Management, which provides wealth management and financial advice services in New Zealand, including KiwiSaver, workplace superannuation, retail investments and investment platforms.
- China partnerships, comprising a minority interest in China Life Pension Company and a minority interest in China Life AMP Asset Management Company, joint ventures with China Life providing exposure to China's pension and asset management markets.

== See also ==
- AMP Building, for a list of buildings used by AMP Limited
- AMP Capital
- Banking Royal Commission
