= List of equipment of the Polish Land Forces =

Polish Land Forces
- Wojska Lądowe
- Military eagle
- Founded: 1918; 108 years ago
- Country: Poland
- Size: ~220,000 (2026) Reserve 350,000
- Part of: Polish Armed Forces

The following is a list of current equipment of the Polish Land Forces. This is not to be confused with the equipment of the Polish Armed Forces, Navy, air force, or territorial defence forces. The list includes current equipment such as helmets, vision systems, communication systems, small arms, combat vehicles, transport vehicles, explosives, missile systems, engineering vehicles, logistical vehicles, trucks, artillery, air defence, helicopters, Unmanned aerial aircraft, as well as future equipment and equipment being replaced.

== Personnel equipment ==
=== Helmets ===
Model	Image	Origin	Type	Variant	Quantity	Details
Hełm HP-05		Poland	Combat helmet	HP-05	50,000/93,000	High cut type helmets. 50,000 delivered. Additional 32,000 ordered in March 2023. Additional 10,000 helmets ordered.
Hełm HBT-02		Poland	Combat helmet	HBT-02	?/~300,000	HBT-02 helmet passed qualification tests as well as practical trials conducted by soldiers of the 18th Mechanized Division. Deliveries will begin in 2025. In 2026, approximately 307,000 units were ordered. HBT-02 is to replace older models used by the Polish Army.
Hełm HB-04		Poland	Combat helmet	Hełm HB-04 HP-04 SG	N/A	Used by the crews of AHS Krab self-propelled howitzers.
Hełm wz. 2005		Poland	Combat helmet	wz. 2005 wz.2005 B	?/84,000	Standard combat helmet of the Polish Land Forces. 60,400 helmets in wz.2005 B variant were ordered and received. From 2023 to 2025, Polish Land Forces are expected to receive more than 80,000 new wz. 2005 helmets. 42,000 donated to Ukraine. Developed by Military Institute of Armament Technology and Maskpol It will be replaced by the Hełm HB-04
Hełm HA-03		Poland	Combat helmet	HA-03	+2,000	Used by Polish airborne formations.
HC-98		Poland	Combat helmet	HC-98 HCL-98 HCZ-98	N/A	Produced in two variants: summer (HCL-98), and winter version (HCZ-98). Leading manufacturer of HC-98 tank headphones is Interprotel based in Radom.
ACVC-H		United States	Combat helmet	ACVC-H	N/A	Use by crews of M1A1FEP, M1A2SEPv3 and M142 HIMARS.

=== Camouflage ===
Model	Image	Origin	Type	Variant	Quantity	Details
wz. 93 Pantera		Poland	Combat uniform	124P/MON 124L/MON	N/A	Standard combat uniform pattern of the Polish Armed Forces (with exception of the Polish Special Forces).
wz. 93 Pantera Pustynna		Poland	Combat uniform	124T/MON	N/A	Polish desert uniform pattern.
K-03 Ryś	No image available	Poland	Combat uniform	K-03 Ryś	7500 by 2027 ~220,000 by 2029	K-03 Ryś (Lynx) was selected as the replacement for the wz. 93 Pantera as the default Combat uniform camouflage pattern for the entire Polish Armed Forces and soldiers from all branches of military are set to receive it by the end of 2028. Ryś (Lynx) was developed in close cooperation between Polish Special Forces and experts from the Military Research and Implementation Center for Uniformed Services in Łódź. It competed with other patterns that were previously also under consideration such as Lampart, MultiCam, WS 62 and WS 31. During evaluation its properties have shown nearly 33% lower detectability during the day than the wz. 93 Pantera and almost twice lower detectability at night than the MultiCam. The design itself is based on five naturally occurring colors carefully selected to seamlessly match the Polish natural landscape and disrupt the silhouette.

=== Ballistic vests ===
Model	Image	Origin	Type	Variant	Quantity	Details
OLV		Poland	Bulletproof vest	OLV KLV	N/A	Protects against 9 mm Parabellum bullets (classified as "bullet resistance class two" according to PN-V-87000-1999 standard). The vests are being modernised with molle straps and put to reserve use.
KWM-01		Poland	Bulletproof vest	KWM-01	N/A	Main Polish army bulletproof vest used by Polish army except for special forces.
KWM-02		Poland	Bulletproof vest	KWM-02	39,700	Ballistic resistance according to PN-V-87000:2011. Soft insert – Bullet resistance: K1A. Fragment resistance: O2. Ordered between 2016-2023.
Plate Carrier Gryf	No image available	Poland	Bulletproof vest	V2K22	?/45,000	Hard ballistic plates have ballistic resistance class K4 according to PN-V-87000:2011, which guarantees resistance against a 7.62x39 mm BZ bullet (armor-piercing incendiary, with a steel core of hardness (62+/-2) HRC) weighing 7.7 +/- 0.1 g and an impact speed of 735 m/s +/- 15 m/s. Additionally, along with the new vests, protection for the shoulders, neck and lower abdomen was ordered. Order for around 30k signed on 31 March 2023, additional order for 15k signed on 24 October 2024. Deliveries 2024-2025.
KKZ-01	No image available	Poland	Bulletproof vest	KKZ-01	?/40,000	Depending on the ballistic package used, the vest provides a level of protection up to class K5AB according to the PN-V-87000:2011 standard. Order for around 40k signed on 7 April 2023.

=== Boots ===
Model	Image	Origin	Type	Variant	Quantity	Details
Wz.939/MON	No image available	Poland	Combat boots	Wz.939/MON	N/A	Standard boots of the Polish Armed Forces.
Wz.933/MON		Poland	Combat boots	Wz.933A/MON	N/A	Standard winter boots of the Polish Armed Forces.

=== Chemical warfare ===
Model	Image	Origin	Type	Variant	Quantity	Details
Maska MP-5		Poland	Gas mask	MP-5	~110,000	The current manufacturer is Maskpol Company.
Maska MP-6		Poland	Gas mask	MP-6	~28,400	The tube for collecting fluids is NATO standard. It allows for attachment of a water bottle as well as canteens or a camelback.
FOO-1		Poland	Protection suit	FOO-1	~25,500	Protection against chemical contamination.

=== Night vision goggles ===
Model	Image	Origin	Type	Variant	Quantity	Details
MU-3M	No image available	Poland	Night vision goggles	MU-3M	~128	
MU-3AM	No image available	Poland	Night vision goggles	MU-3AM	~554	
MU-3ADM	No image available	Poland	Night vision goggles	MU-3ADM	~673	
PCS-5M	No image available	Poland	Night vision goggles	PCS-5M	~125	
NPL-1M	No image available	Poland	Night vision binoculars	NPL-1M	~140	
SCT RUBIN	No image available	Poland	Thermal imaging sight	SCT RUBIN	~45	

=== Communication devices ===
Model	Image	Origin	Type	Variant	Quantity	Details
FONET		Poland	Communications system	FONET	N/A	Installed on, among others, Rosomak vehicles, K2 tanks, AHS Krab, K239PL.
Topaz		Poland	Communications system	Topaz	N/A	Installed on the 2S1 Gożdzik gun-howitzer, wz. 1977 Dana, AHS Krab, AHS K9, M120 Rak, and WR-40 Langusta rocket launchers, K239PL.
HMS C3IS Jaśmin	No image available	Poland	Communications system	HMS C3IS Jaśmin	N/A	Installed on the 2S1 Gożdzik, wz. 1977 Dana, AHS Krab, AHS K9, M120 Rak guns, and the WR-40 Langusta, K239PL rocket launchers.
BMS SitaWare Frontline	No image available	Denmark	Communications system	BMS SitaWare Frontline	N/A	In use by command battalions of Abrams M1A1 FEP, M1A2 SEPv3 tanks and M88 Hercules recovery vehicles.

=== Parachutes ===
Model	Image	Origin	Type	Variant	Quantity	Details
AD-2000		Poland	Parachute	AD-2000 AD-2000M	N/A 1200	Standard parachute of the Polish Armed Forces.
AD-95 Dedal		Poland	Parachute	AD-95 Dedal AD-95M AD-95M s.2 AZ 95	3800 N/A N/A N/A	
TPDS-LLT	No image available	Poland	Parachute	TPDS-LLT	33	

== Infantry weapons ==
=== Knives ===
Model	Image	Origin	Type	Variant	Quantity	Details
6H4 Bayonet		Soviet Union Polish People's Republic	Bayonet	6H4	~100,000	Designed for use with 7.62 mm AKMs as well as 5.45×39 mm caliber 1988 Tantal and 5.56 mm. 1996 Beryl.
Military knife wz. 92	No image available	Poland	Combat knife	wz. 92	~3000	Designed for special forces.
Military knife wz. 98		Poland	Combat knife	wz. 98 wz. 98A wz. 98Z	~500	Improved version of its predecessor: military knife wz. 92. Modified to increase resistance to dynamic loads.

=== Firearms ===
==== Handguns ====
Model	Image	Origin	Type	Variant	Quantity	Details
WIST-94		Poland	9×19mm Parabellum Semi-automatic pistol	WIST-94 WIST-94L	20,210	In process of being replaced by FB VIS-100.
P99		Germany	9×19mm Parabellum Semi-automatic pistol	P99 QA	~500	Limited use in the Polish Land Forces, predominantly by high-ranking officers and members of the general staff.
FB VIS 100		Poland	9×19mm Parabellum Semi-automatic pistol	VIS 100	29,600/48,000	20000 delivered. Intended to replace WIST-94 and P-83 Wanad in all their variants. Testing begun in April 2017. First batch received in the early 2018. Additional 28,000 pistols ordered in May 2023. 9600 delivered in 2024.

==== Flare gun ====
Model	Image	Origin	Type	Variant	Quantity	Details
Wz. 78		Polish People's Republic	26 mm flare gun	Wz.78	N/A	Equipped with a blunderbuss designed to throw UGŁ-200 grenades. Was intended to replace the RWGŁ-1 and RWGŁ-2. Developed by FB "Łucznik" Radom in the 1970s.

==== Submachine gun ====
Model	Image	Origin	Type	Variant	Quantity	Details
PM-84 Glauberyt		Poland	9×19mm Parabellum submachine gun	PM-84P PM-98	~15,000	30,000 more in storage

==== Shotgun ====
Model	Image	Origin	Type	Variant	Quantity	Details
Mossberg 500		United States	12 gauge shotgun	M590	~148	Also used by Military Gendarmerie and by the Police.

==== Assault rifles ====
Model	Image	Origin	Type	Variant	Quantity	Details
FB Mini-Beryl		Poland	5.56mm NATO assault rifle	1996B 1996C	~3,000 ~17,000	Standard service rifle. Carbine version of the FB Beryl Some are being repaired and modified.
FB Beryl		Poland	5.56mm NATO assault rifle	1996A 1996B 1996C	~45,000 ~10,000 ~39,000	Standard service rifle. Some are being repaired and modified.
MSBS Grot		Poland	5.56mm NATO modular rifle	MSBS-R MSBS C16 FB-M0 MSBS C16 FB-M1 MSBS C16 FB-M2 MSBS C14 A3	~350 1000 29 691 ~116 500 0/46 000	New standard service rifle, total of 184,000 ordered. Deliveries: January 2023: 71,100.; November 2023: 100,000.; 2024: 48,147.; Undisclosed number sent to Ukraine, and unknown number of ceremonial rifle MSBS Grot-R on order.

==== Sniper rifles ====
Model	Image	Origin	Type	Variant	Quantity	Details
MSBS-7,62N		Poland	7.62mm NATO Designated marksman rifle	MSBS Grot 762N	250	MSBS-7,62N follows the MSBS-5,56 design and shares some parts as handguards, stocks and grips which are interchangeable. Developed by FB "Łucznik" Radom and Military University of Technology. Received in 2024.
Bor		Poland	7.62mm NATO / .338 Lapua Magnum sniper rifle	Bor Alex-338 Alex Tactical Sport	~1000	The Bor rifle is relatively lightweight (6.1 kg) which makes it manageable for snipers on the move. The rifle has a total length of 1,038 mm, with barrels that can measure either 680 mm or 560 mm depending on the variant. Developed by Zakłady Mechaniczne Tarnów Orders: 31 October 2023:50 of Bor will be delivered between 2023 and 2024
Sako TRG		Finland	7.62mm NATO / .338 Lapua Magnum sniper rifle	TRG-21 TRG-22 TRG M10	40 206 150	The very first TRG-21 units delivered were used by the Police Force, GROM and the 1st Special Commando Regiment.: For operational needs in Iraq, 130 TRG-22 were ordered in 2004.; 150 TRG M10 were ordered by Polish Land Forces in 2016.; The remaining 30 TRG-21s were introduced mainly into the 6th Airborne Brigade as well as the 25th Air Assault Brigade.
WKW Wilk	Poligon w Wędzrzynie (5)	Poland	.50 BMG anti-materiel rifle	WKW Wilk	80	The nickname "WKW" stands for Wielkokalibrowy Karabin Wyborowy or Large Caliber Sniper Rifle. Its military designation in the Polish army is known as the Tor. Developed by Zakłady Mechaniczne Tarnów. Unknown number donated to Ukraine.

==== General purpose machine guns ====
Model	Image	Origin	Type	Variant	Quantity	Details
UKM-2000		Poland	7.62mm NATO General purpose machine gun	UKM-2000P UKM-2000P zmod. UKM-2000C UKM-2000D	894 ~3400 337 8	Standard issue GPMG. Unknown number donated to Ukraine. Deliveries: UKM-2000P zmod: 30 November 2024: 215 delivered.
M240		United States Belgium	7.62mm NATO general purpose machine gun	M240C	666/732	Standard equipment for Abrams tanks, two units per vehicle.
MG 3		West Germany	7.62mm NATO general purpose machine gun	MG3A1	522	Standard equipment for fighting vehicles purchased from Germany.

==== Heavy machine guns ====
Model	Image	Origin	Type	Variant	Quantity	Details
M2 Browning		United States	.50 BMG heavy machine gun	M2 Heavy Barrel	331	Standard equipment for American Abrams family military vehicles. Used on 250 M1 A2 Abrams (SEPv3), 116 M1A1 (FEP) and 33 M88A2 recovery vehicles.
Daewoo K6		South Korea	.50 BMG heavy machine gun	Daewoo K6	180	Standard equipment for K2 tanks.
M134 Minigun		United States	7.62×51mm NATO heavy machine gun	M134G	10	Mounted on Mi-17-1W helicopters as an on-board weapon.
DShK		Soviet Union Polish People's Republic Czechoslovakia	12.7×108mm heavy machine gun	DSzKM	~160	Only used on WZT-2 ARV and 152mm SpGH DANA.
WKM-B		Poland	.50 BMG heavy machine gun	WKM-B WKM-Bz	~450 8	NSW adapted to the .50 BMG NATO munition round. Orders: 1 December 2023: 600 WKM-Bms were included in the framework agreement between the Armaments Agency and the consortium of PGZ S.A. and Huta Stalowa Wola.; 11 July 2024: An agreement was signed regarding the delivery of the undisclosed number of large-caliber machine guns WKM-Bm.

=== Explosive weapons ===
==== Grenades ====
Model	Image	Origin	Type	Variant	Quantity	Details
Rifle Grenades		Poland	HEAP grenade Incendiary grenade Smoke grenade Illuminating grenade	GNPO NGZ-93 NGD-93 NGOS	N/A	Can be used with Kbs wz. 1996 Beryl and Kbk wz. 1996 Mini-Beryl.
RGD-2		Soviet Union Polish People's Republic	Smoke grenade	RGD-2B RGD-2CZ	N/A	Only white and black smoke.
UGD-200	No image available	Poland	Smoke grenade	UGD-200	N/A	Coloured or white smoke.
RGO-88		Poland	Fragmentation grenade	RGO-88	N/A	Successor to F-1.
RGZ-89		Poland	Fragmentation grenade	RGZ-89	N/A	Uses UZRG and UZRGM fuse. To replace RG-42.
F-1		Soviet Union Polish People's Republic	Fragmentation grenade	F-1	N/A	In process of being replaced by RGZ-89 and RGO-88.
RG-42		Soviet Union	Fragmentation grenade	RG-42	N/A	In process of being replaced by RGZ-89.

==== Grenade launchers ====
Model	Image	Origin	Type	Variant	Quantity	Details
Daewoo K4		South Korea	40mm automatic grenade launcher	K4	Several hundred	Several hundred K4 automatic grenade launchers ordered.
Mk.19	Granatnik Mk. 19 Wojsko Polskie	United States	40 mm automatic grenade launcher	Mk 19 Mod 3	190	Delivery: The first 20 units were donated to Poland in 2007 by Israel.
wz. 74 Pallad wz. 83 Pallad-D		Polish People's Republic	40 mm grenade launcher	wz. 74 Pallad wz. 83 Pallad-D	~6500 ~450	wz. 74 Pallad can be attached to AKM, AKMS, kbk wz. 88 Tantal and kbs wz. 96 Beryl. To be replaced by GPBO-40. Pallad-D is also known as Wz. 1983 grenade launcher. To be replaced by GSBO-40.
GPBO-40; GSBO-40		Poland	40 mm grenade launcher	GPBO-40 GSBO-40	746 160	GPBO-40 is an underbarrel grenade launcher that can be attached to the kbs wz. 1996 Beryl and the MSBS Grot. GSBO-40 is a stand-alone version with stock and pistol grip.

==== Anti-tank weapons ====
Model	Image	Origin	Type	Variant	Quantity	Details
Carl Gustaf		Sweden	84 mm multi-role recoilless rifle	M4	> 6,000	Several thousand M4 launchers and hundreds of thousands of rounds of ammunition are scheduled for delivery between 2024 and 2027.
M72 LAW		United States Norway Poland	66 mm rocket-propelled grenade launcher	M72 EC Mk I	~3,500 / 10,000+ launchers	A contract pertaining to delivery of several thousand M72 EC MK1 was announced on 7 July 2022.
FGM-148F Javelin		United States	127mm Advanced Anti-Tank Weapon System-Medium (AAWS-M)	FGM-148F	110 launchers 680 missiles	Purchase of 50 additional Launchers and 500 Missiles was announced on 31 January 2023. Poland was the first country outside of the US to receive the Javelin F-Model missile variant.
Spike		Israel Poland	130mm Anti-tank guided missile (ATGM)	Spike-LR	264 launchers 3,675 missiles	Deal with Israeli manufacturer included production of components and assembly in Poland. 264 launchers and 3675 Spike-LR version missiles were delivered between 2004 and 2013. In August 2023 several hundred of additional Spike-LR missiles were ordered with deliveries running between 2023 and 2026.
RPG-7		Soviet Union	40 mm rocket-propelled grenade launcher	RPG-7 RPG-7D RPG-7DN1 RPG-7W	~2,000	Some of them (RPG-7DN1) are equipped with Polish NV sight PCS-5. To be replaced by Carl Gustaf.
9M14 Malyutka		Soviet Union	125mm Anti-tank guided missile (ATGM)	9P133 Malutka-P	N/A	NATO designation: AT-3 Sagger. Unknown number still in service. 20,000 missiles were delivered by the Soviet Union between 1970 and 1985, including missiles for the BWP-1, BRDM-2, Mil Mi-2, and Mil Mi-24.

==== Anti-aircraft warfare ====
Model	Image	Origin	Type	Variant	Quantity	Details
PPZR Piorun		Poland	72mm Man-portable air-defense system	PPZR Piorun	1,020 launchers 4,800 missiles	Can be mounted on Poprad, and by anti-aircraft missile and artillery system PSR-A Pilica. Unspecified number donated to Ukraine. Additional 600 launchers and 3,500 missiles were ordered by the Polish Armed Forces in 2022. And a common framework agreement was signed in August 2026 for additional systems with Lithuania, Norway and Latvia.
PPZR Grom		Poland	72mm Man-portable air-defense system	PPZR Grom	400 launchers 2,000 missiles	2000 missiles delivered. Unspecified number donated to Ukraine.

==== Land mines ====
Model	Image	Origin	Type	Variant	Quantity	Details
TM-62M		Soviet Union Polish People's Republic	Anti-tank mine	TM-62	N/A	The MWCz-62 fuse is used, among other things, to detonate the TM-62M and MPP-B mines. TM-62M mines can be placed manually, using SUM-Kalina Minelayer.
MPP-B Wierzba	No image available	Poland	Anti-tank mine	MPP-B Wierzba	N/A	MWCz-62 fuse is used, to detonate the TM-62M and MPP-B mines.
MN-111		Poland	Off-route anti-tank mine	MN-111	N/A	The mine is designed to penetrate soft ground up to the fins, which spread out flat across the ground. The mine uses a magnetic influence fuze, which is triggered by the magnetic field of an armoured vehicle.
MN-121		Poland	Scatterable anti-tank mine	MN-121	N/A	The mine is cylindrical with ten wire legs which fold outward to keep the mine upright. The mine uses a magnetic influence fuze. The mine can be deployed either from aircraft, a specialised Minelayer or 122 mm Multiple rocket launchers.
MN-123	Mounted on ISM Koroton	Poland	Scatterable anti-tank mine	MN-123 MN-123/C	6 tracked in service and 24 wheeled ordered	It is normally deployed from a ground vehicle, using a dispensing system holding 80 mines. The mine can be manually laid. Like MN-121, it uses a magnetic influence fuze which detects when a vehicle passes over it. Orders: 14 June 2023: 24 as part of the Baobab-K Minelayer programme which will use MN-123 and MN-123/C variants.
MPB		Poland	Off-route anti-tank mine	MPB	N/A	Consists of a metal cylinder filled with explosives, mounted horizontally in an adjustable frame. The mine can be triggered by either a contact fuze (MPB-ZK variant) or an influence fuze (MPB-ZN variant). Developed by BELMA with Military University of Technology.

== Indirect fire ==
=== Light mortars ===
Model	Image	Origin	Type	Variant	Quantity	Details
LRM vz. 99 ANTOS	No image available	Czech Republic	60,7 mm mortar	LRM vz. 99 ANTOS	200+	
LMP-2017		Poland	60 mm mortar	LMP-2017 LMP-2017M	780	100 donated to Ukraine.
LM-60	Mortar LM-60D	Poland	60mm mortar	LM-60C LM-60D	64 530	Developed by Huta Stalowa Wola together with the Military Institute of Armament Technology and the Research and Development Centre for Mechanical Equipment (OBR SM) in Tarnów.
M-98		Poland	98 mm mortar	M-98I	93	Major repairs of M-98 mortars are carried out by Huta Stalowa Wola. Developed by Huta Stalowa Wola.
Wz. 38/43		Soviet Union	120 mm mortar	Wz. 38/43	131	To be replaced by RAK mortar. Large numbers donated/sold to Ukraine.
2B11		Soviet Union	120 mm mortar	2B11	14	To be replaced by RAK mortar. Large numbers donated/sold to Ukraine.

=== Self-propelled mortar ===
Model	Image	Origin	Type	Variant	Quantity	Details
M120 Rak		Poland	120 mm Self-propelled mortar	SMK	124/188	Mounted on KTO Rosomak ("Wolverine") chassis.

=== Self-propelled howitzers ===
Model	Image	Origin	Calibre	Variant	Quantity	Details
K9 Thunder		South Korea	155 mm L/52	K9A1	218	218 155mm K9A1 Self-Propelled Howitzers are to be delivered between 2022 and 2026 and upgraded to K9PL standard at a later date.
K9 Thunder		South Korea Poland	155 mm L/52	K9PL	~24/146	606 155mm K9PL Self-Propelled Howitzers are to be produced in Poland starting from 2026 onwards, deliveries are scheduled to be completed by 2027 The modernization will include: ZZKO Topaz, Fonet connectivity, Obra system, fire-proof, explosion-proof and Filter ventilation
Krab		Poland	155 mm L/52	Krab Krab 2	60/260 0/48	Krab: Self-propelled gun-howitzer (SPG), 155 mm L/52. 54 units were handed over to Ukraine Krab 2 Krab modernization: Auto loader (Projectiles and charges), ZSSU-12,7 (WKM-B), C-Obra (Rheinmetall ROSY), SOD-1 ATENA
Wz. 1977 DANA		Czechoslovakia Czech Republic Poland	152 mm	Dana-T Dana-M	101 10	By 2024, 10 units were converted to the DANA M standard.
2S1 Goździk		Soviet Union Polish People's Republic Poland	122 mm	2S1M Goździk 2S1T Goździk	206	206 in use as of 2024. Intended to be replaced by AHS Krab and M120 Rak. Large number donated to Ukraine.

=== Multiple rocket launchers ===
Model	Image	Origin	Type	Variant	Quantity	Details
K239 Chunmoo	K239PL MSPO24 1	South Korea Poland	239mm multiple rocket launcher, and 600mm tactical ballistic missile	K239PL HOMAR-K	156/290	218 K239 ordered in November 2022, to be delivered by 2027. 72 additional units ordered in April 2024 MLRS system mounted on 8×8 truck Jelcz P882.57.
M142 HIMARS		United States	Multiple rocket launcher, and tactical ballistic missile	HOMAR-A	20	20 delivered under the agreement signed on 13 February 2019. On 11 September 2023 an additional order of 486 units (468 of them to be adapted to Jelcz trucks and equipped with TOPAZ system) was approved. The delivery is expected to begin in 2025.
WR-40 Langusta		Poland	122 mm/ multiple rocket launcher	WR-40	75	Several thousand 122mm M-21 FHE "Feniks" missiles were ordered from domestic producer MESKO.
RM-70		Czechoslovakia	122 mm/ multiple rocket launcher	RM-70/85	29	Uses 122 mm M-21 FHD "FENIKS" Missiles.

== Armoured vehicles ==
=== Main battle tanks ===
Model	Image	Origin	Main armament	Variant	Quantity	Details
K2 Black Panther		South Korea; Poland	120 mm L/55	K2 (batch IV)	238/296	K2 (batch IV) are to be upgraded to the K2PL standard at a later date. Contract for the second batch of 180 K2 signed on the 1st of August 2025 (116 K2GF and 3 K2PL units are to be built in South Korea, 61 K2PL units are to be built in Poland). Overall, 1000 units of K2PL are planned to enter service. 25 August 2026 first 28 tanks from 2nd executive agreement had been delivered to Poland. Total: approx. 238 k2 tanks . Weight: 56 t
K2 Black Panther		South Korea; Poland	120 mm L/55	K2PL	0/64	Production of K2PL in Poland is expected to start in 2028.Weight: 61,5 t. The modernization will include: > turret/hull side armor, RCWS, APS System hard-kill, Anti-drone system (Jammer {PL:Zagłuszarka}), All-around observation system.
M1 Abrams		United States	120 mm L/44	M1A1 FEP	116	All to be upgraded to SEPv3 standard at a later date.Weight: 61,3 t
M1 Abrams		United States	120 mm L/44	M1A2 SEPv3	217/250	250 M1A2 SEPv3s are scheduled for delivery in 2025 and 2026. 38 Delivered 11 September 2025. 32 Delivered 1 December 2025. 29 Delivered 9 February 2026. 36 Delivered 25 June 2026. 35 Delivered 21 September 2026. Weight: 66,8 t
Leopard 2	Leopard 2PL - Szkolenie Wojska Polskiego w Nowej Dębie (cropped) Polish Leopard 2A5 main battle tank during Strong Europe Tank Challenge 2017	West Germany	120 mm L/44	2A4	13	In process of being upgraded to 2PL. 128 Leopard 2A4s acquired in 2002 and 2003 and 14 in 2015. 14 were donated to Ukraine. Weight: 55,2 t
Leopard 2	Leopard 2PL - Szkolenie Wojska Polskiego w Nowej Dębie (cropped) Polish Leopard 2A5 main battle tank during Strong Europe Tank Challenge 2017	Germany	120 mm L/44	2A5	105	105 Leopard 2A5s were received by November 2015.Weight: 59,5 t
Leopard 2	Leopard 2PL - Szkolenie Wojska Polskiego w Nowej Dębie (cropped) Polish Leopard 2A5 main battle tank during Strong Europe Tank Challenge 2017	Poland	120 mm L/44	2PL	115	Former 2A4 upgraded to 2PL standard.Weight: 59,2 t
PT-91 Twardy		Poland	125 mm L/48	PT-91	12	At least 60 were donated to Ukraine.
PT-91 Twardy		Poland	125 mm L/48	PT-91MA	27	T-72M upgraded to PT-91 standard.
PT-91 Twardy		Poland	125 mm L/48	PT-91MA1	113	T-72M1 upgraded to PT-91 standard.

=== Infantry fighting vehicles ===
Model	Image	Origin	Type	Variant	Quantity	Details
BWP Borsuk		Poland	Tracked amphibious infantry fighting vehicle	BWP Borsuk	18 / 262 (1,014 planned, includes 5 prototypes)	Pre-production purchases: 6 between 2022 and 2024 (not accounted as not in service); Framework agreement: 1,400 vehicles, signed in 2023, including the IFV variant and 5 other specialised variants.; Firm orders (serial production): 27 March 2025: 111 equipped with a ZSSW-30 (2025 - 2029) + 5 prototypes also planned for operational service.; 31 May 2026:146 additional ordered as part of the EU's SAFE initiative.; Deliveries: 15 in December 2025; 3 in November 2026; Weight: 28 t
KTO Rosomak	Rosomak IFV with ZSSW-30 RCWS	Finland Poland (under licence)	Wheeled amphibious infantry fighting vehicle	Rosomak	360	Licensed variant of Patria AMV that is manufactured in Poland. Some M1M variants refit for use in Afghanistan are no longer amphibious due to extra armour weight.
KTO Rosomak	Rosomak IFV with ZSSW-30 RCWS	Finland Poland (under licence)	Wheeled amphibious infantry fighting vehicle	Rosomak	43/128	Rosomak with Polish unmanned turret ZSSW-30. 70 ordered in 2022 and 58 ordered in July 2024. Weight: 22,5 t
KTO Rosomak	Rosomak IFV with ZSSW-30 RCWS	Finland Poland (under licence)	Wheeled amphibious infantry fighting vehicle	Rosomak-L	0/80	Longer by 60 cm version of Rosomak with Polish unmanned turret ZSSW-30.Weight: 25,5 t
BWP-1		Soviet Union Czechoslovakia	Tracked amphibious infantry fighting vehicle	BWP-1 BWP-1D	~850	BWP-1 and BWP-1D are Polish designations for the Soviet BWP-1D and BMP-1K respectively. MP-31 in Polish service is sometimes called BWP-1D. Will not be retired until at least 2030. To be replaced by BWP Borsuk. Weight: 13,2 t

=== Armoured personnel carriers ===
Model	Image	Origin	Type	Variant	Quantity	Details
KTO Rosomak	KTO Rosomak in Afghanistan 2010	Finland Poland (under licence)	Wheeled armored personnel carrier	Rosomak-M2	4	Amphibious armoured personnel carrier either unarmed or with .50 BMG.
KTO Rosomak	KTO Rosomak in Afghanistan 2010	Finland Poland (under licence)	Wheeled armored personnel carrier	Rosomak-M3	31	Up-armoured APC to M1 IFV standard armour and armed with .50 BMG WKM-B or Mk 19 + PKM or UKM-2000 as secondary weapon.
KTO Rosomak	KTO Rosomak in Afghanistan 2010	Finland Poland (under licence)	Wheeled armored personnel carrier	Rosomak-S	98	APC that is capable of carrying a full squad and is armed with two Spike-LR ATGM. Another 60 on order as of 2020. Deliveries: 2021: 38
KTO Rosomak	KTO Rosomak in Afghanistan 2010		Driver training vehicle.	Rosomak-NJ	4	Driving training vehicle.

=== Tank destroyers ===
Model	Image	Origin	Type	Variant	Quantity	Details
Humvee		United States Poland	Tank destroyer	Tumak-5 (M1045A2)	18	M1045A2 with Spike LR launcher.
BRDM-2		Soviet Union	Tank destroyer	9P133 Malutka-P	27	Equipped with 9M14 Malyutka. It will be replaced through Ottokar-Brzoza programme.
Ottokar Brzoza		Poland	Tank destroyer	Ottokar Brzoza	N/A	It will be equipped with Brimstone missiles.

=== Mine-resistant ambush protected vehicles ===
Model	Image	Origin	Type	Variant	Quantity	Details
Cougar		United States	MRAP	Cougar 4x4	300	300 Cougar 4x4s were delivered in late 2022.
Oshkosh M-ATV		United States	MRAP	M1240A1	79	Delivered January 2024.

=== Armoured reconnaissance vehicles ===
Model	Image	Origin	Type	Variant	Quantity	Details
AMZ Bóbr 3		Poland	Amphibious Reconnaissance vehicle	AMZ Bóbr-3	2/286	Delivery of 286 units is set to take place between 2025 and 2035. Intended to replace BRDM-2 currently in service. Orders: On 14 August 2024: 28 AMZ Bóbr-3 were ordered for PLN 800 million. To be delivered between 2026 and 2028.; On 29 May 2026: 24 more vehicles ordered, financed by SAFE.
KTO Rosomak		Finland Poland (under licence)	Reconnaissance vehicle	Rosomak-AWR	20/31	Artillery Reconnaissance Vehicle (AWR), ~20 t, amphibious. According to procurement plans, 19 vehicles were scheduled for delivery in 2025.
KTO Rosomak		Finland Poland (under licence)	Reconnaissance vehicle	Rosomak-WSRiD	2	Rosomak WSRiD - Multi-sensor reconnaissance and supervision vehicle.
Żmija		Poland	Long-range reconnaissance vehicle	LPU Wirus 4	118	Deliveries: 2021: 25; 2023: 35; 2024: 58
BRDM-2		Soviet Union Poland	Amphibious Reconnaissance vehicle	BRDM-2 BRDM-2 R5	~282 ~87	To be replaced by AMZ Bóbr 3
BWP-1		Soviet Union Poland	Amphibious Reconnaissance vehicle	BWR-1D BWR-1S	~38	Currently being upgraded.

=== Light armoured utility vehicles ===
Model	Image	Origin	Type	Variant	Quantity	Details
K151 Raycolt		South Korea Poland	Light utility vehicle	K153 Legwan Legwan L	~50/1651	Nearly 1600 to be produced in Poland between 2024 and 2035. Equipped with Legwan LRM (swivel mount) Deliveries: 16 April 2024: 3 delivered; 1 August 2024: 14 delivered; 2 October 2025: at least 9 delivered
Humvee		United States	Light utility vehicle	Tumak-2 Tumak-3 M1043A2	96 60 1	M1043A2 with Kobuz RWS, sometimes referred to as Tumak-4.

== Command vehicles ==
Model	Image	Origin	Type	Variant	Quantity	Details
Waran	Waran HSW MSPO22	Poland; Czech Republic	Command vehicle	Waran 4x4	0/150	To be delivered in the years 2027–2028. Will be used by battery commanders and fire platoon commanders.
Heron	HSW Heron 20240903	Poland Czech Republic	Command vehicle	Heron 6x6	0/30	To be delivered in the years 2027–2028. It will be used by division commanders and divisional chiefs of staff.
Universal Track Carrier LPG		Poland	Tracked command vehicle	WD WDSz	7/46 19/207	More than one donated to Ukraine. More on order through Regina program.
KTO Rosomak		Finland Poland (under licence)	Armoured wheeled command vehicle	Kroton Kroton-bis Zawilec	17 0/12 6/24	7 for the Multinational Division North East. 2 more ordered for the 18th Division during the MSPO 2019 exhibition. On 21 December 2020 an agreement was signed for delivery of 8 more vehicles to the 16th Mechanized Division between 2021 and 2022. Another order for 6 more vehicles was signed in October 2023. A further order for 12 more vehicles was signed in December 2023, to be delivered between 2026 and 2027.
KTO Rosomak		Finland Poland (under licence)	Armoured wheeled command vehicle (artillery)	Rosomak AWD	61	Command vehicle for Rak firing module mounted on KTO Rosomak chassis.
RWŁC-10/T		Poland	Moving node of digital communication	RWŁC-10/T	~450	
ZWD-10R/K Łowcza-3K		Poland	Wheeled command truck	ZWD-10R/K	8	
PKK		Poland	Field cryptographic chancellery vehicle	PKK-S	50	
WWK-10/C		Poland	Mobile crane	WWK-10/C	32	Another 27 on order. Before 2015 WWK-10/C cable vehicles were built using Star 944DK chassis.
Tumak-6		United States Poland	Wheeled all-terrain command vehicle	Tumak-6	9	
M113		United States Germany	Tracked command vehicle	M113 M577	13 6	
ADK-11		Poland	Wheeled command truck	ADK-11	N/A	
ZWD-1		Poland	Tracked command vehicle	ZWD-1	94	
ZWDSz		Soviet Union Poland	Tracked command vehicle	ZWDSz-1 ZWDSz-2	13 6	
ZWD-10R Łowcza		Poland	Tracked command vehicle	ZWD-10R	4	
BRDM-2		Soviet Union	Wheeled amphibious command vehicle	R-1A R-5	98	
ZWD-3		Poland	Wheeled all-terrain command vehicle	ZWD-3	~250	
ZWD-2	No image available	Poland	Tracked command vehicle	ZWD-2	5	
WD-2001		Poland	Multi-purpose off-road vehicle command vehicle	WD-2001	N/A	
Mercedes Benz G-Wagen		Germany	Multi-purpose off-road vehicle command vehicle	GD 290	96	

== Unarmoured vehicles ==
=== Off-road vehicles ===
Model	Image	Origin	Type	Variant	Quantity	Details
Mercedes-Benz G-Class		Germany	Multi-purpose off-road vehicle	GD 290 MB290GD WD MB 250	96 25 40	The Polish Armed Forces currently operate 140 G-class vehicles. The military police uses 13 GD 290s.
Ford Ranger		United States	Multi-purpose off-road vehicle	XTL	~1034	Equipped with 16-inch steel rims with run-flat inserts, hardtop body steel engine housing, and AT BFGoodrich tires. Inspektorat Uzbrojenia ordered 648 cars (485 as an initial order and 163 as an expansion option) Second Purchase was made in November 2023 of Additional 324 Ford Ranger.
Tarpan Honker		Poland	Multi-purpose off-road vehicle	Tarpan Honker Daewoo Honker Honker-2000 Honker 2000 2N Honker 2324 Rys ZWD-3 WD-2001 REA "Perkun" Honker Saper	286 348 647 ? ? 172 ? 14 >2	To be replaced.
Skorpion-3		Poland	Multi-purpose off-road vehicle	Skorpion-3	80	Armored and heavier version of Honker. To be replaced by Żmija long range reconnaissance vehicle.
PWA Aero		Poland	All-terrain vehicle off-road vehicle	PWA Aero	80	Adapted to helicopter transport (attached below deck), or to be dropped on a 12 ft "V" 108 "PDS landing platform from C-130 or C-295M airplanes. 55 vehicles and 105 special trailers initially ordered. In 2020, the order was extended to 80 vehicles and 160 trailers.

=== Quads ===
Model	Image	Origin	Type	Variant	Quantity	Details
Honda		Japan	All-terrain vehicle / Quad	TRX-300 FW	N/A	Orders: 13 November 2019: 49 vehicles, most of which, i.e. 48, will go to the Territorial Defense Forces and one to the Land Forces.; 5 February 2022: The announcement of the order for 27 quads with an option for another 25 quads.
Polaris		United States	All-terrain vehicle/ Quad	Sportsan X2 800EFI	N/A	Orders: 13 November 2019: 49 vehicles, most of which, i.e. 48, will go to the Territorial Defense Forces and one to the Land Forces.; 5 February 2022: Order for 27 quads with an option for another 25 quads.
Arctic Cat		United States	All-terrain vehicle / Quad	Arctic Cat 400 4x4	N/A	Orders: 13 November 2019: 49 vehicles, most of which, i.e. 48, will go to the Territorial Defense Forces and one to the Land Forces.; 5 February 2022: Order for 27 quads with an option for another 25 quads.
Bombardier Outlander		Canada	All-terrain vehicle / Quad	Bombardier Outlander 650	N/A	Orders: 13 November 2019:49 vehicles, most of which, i.e. 48, will go to the Territorial Defense Forces and one to the Land Forces.; 5 February 2022: Order for 27 quads with an option for another 25 quads.

== Logistics ==
=== Transport vehicles ===
Model	Image	Origin	Type	Variant	Quantity	Details
Tumak-4		United States	Military truck	Tumak-4	31	
Star		Poland	Military truck	Star 200 Star 244 Star 266 Star 266M Star 660M2-D Star 660M3 Star 944K Star 944KD Star 1466ML Star 1444 Star 15.225 Star 14.220DK Star 14.225DK R-140M GD-2 (Typ 528) Typ 514 CD-5 (Typ 520) WUS-3 IRS ADK-11 Star 266-based excavator Star-266 AP-64 Star-266 BP-64	Several hundreds	Autobox Innovations Sp. z o.o. Sp.j. modernized about 2000 Star 266 trucks of different varieties. Orders: 17 July 2024: Agreement was signed with Autobox Innovations Sp. z o.o. Sp.j. on the implementation of the modernization and reconstruction of the next batch of trucks of the Star 266 family.; The some of Star 266 trucks will the be upgraded to Star 266M2 standard.; Future Orders: Possible multi-year contract for the modernization of 758 trucks (with the option of extending with another 201).
Jelcz		Poland	Military truck	442.32 P/S662D.43 P662D.43 P662D.35 P662D.34 P642D C642D.35 C642D.34 C662D.35 P/S862D.43 P/S842D.43 P/S842D.35 P662.D35 AWRU P882D.53 WA P662D.35 WRUiE	1039 178 7 15 101 1 36 15 1 70 1 3 9 10 14/138 2/23	P/S662D.43, P662D.43, P662D.35 and P662D.34 are different variants of JELCZ-662, P642D, C642D.35 and C642D.34 are different variants of JELCZ-642, P/S862D.43 is a variant of JELCZ-862, P/S842D.43 and P/S842D.35 are different variants of JELCZ-842. AWRU armament repair shop part of KMO Rak. WA ammunition vehicles, WRUiE armament and electronics repair shop. Part of Regina DMO.
Jelcz P882 D53	Jelcz P882 D53 skadrowany	Poland	Ammunition wagon	WA	20/31	Unknown number was donated to Ukraine|
Iveco Eurotrakker		Italy	Military truck	N/A	N/A	
Iveco Stralis		Italy	Military truck	N/A	83	
Iveco Trakker 500	No image available	Italy	Military truck	N/A	9	
Iveco Eurotrakker		Italy	Military dump truck	N/A	N/A	
Iveco Eurocargo		Italy	Military truck	N/A	309	
Tatra		Czechoslovakia	Military truck	Tatra 815	N/A	Only specialized variants are in service.
Volvo FM	Volvo fm wojsko polskie 2	Sweden	Military truck	Volvo FM VTJ3R/VP 6x2	48	
Daimler Benz Unimog		Germany	Military truck	Unimog 1300L	69	
Mercedes-Benz		Germany	Military truck	Mercedes-Benz 1017A	211	
Fuel trucks
Scania XT 6×6		Sweden	Fuel trucks	CD10S	0 / 215 (+ 105 in option)	Capacity: 10 m^{3}. Ordered in December 2024, supplied by CELTECH Sp. z o.o. in Poland.
Scania 6×4 semi-truck		Sweden	Fuel semi-trucks	CD27 Kayman	0 / 73	Capacity: 27 m^{3}. Supplied by CELTECH Sp. z o.o. in Poland.

=== Heavy equipment transporters ===
Model	Image	Origin	Type	Variant	Quantity	Details
Jelcz Jak Tank Transporters		Poland	Armoured heavy equipment transporter	C882.62 8×8	26 (+dozens on order)	Orders: First in 2019 for 14 sets + option for 9 sets + 3 tractors.; Second order in 2024 for dozens of additional sets.; Lowboy trailer used the ST775-20W.
SLT 50 Elefant		Austria; Germany	Heavy equipment transporter	SLT 50-2	6	
Mercedes-Benz Zetros		Germany	Heavy equipment transporter	Zetros 3348 AS 6x6	54/214	Orders: 31 Ordered in October 2021 to be used as tank transporter with the DobrowolskiD OB70W low bed semi-trailer.; Further 23 ordered in October 2025.; 160 ordered in May 2026.; Engine OM460 engine with Allison 4500 SP automatic transmission and VG2800 reduction box.
Mercedes-Benz Actros		Germany	Heavy equipment transporter	Actros 3353AS 6×6	31	Dobrowolski NC wz. 21 lowboy trailers
Iveco EuroTrakker		Italy	Heavy equipment transporter	MP720E48WT and MP720T50WT	59	

=== Vans ===
Model	Image	Origin	Type	Variant	Quantity	Details
Fiat Ducato		Italy France	Van	Fiat Ducato Seicento Van "W"	~375	Both are used as low-capacity transport vehicles that can carry up to 4 tonnes of cargo. Deliveries: 2007–164.; 2008–110.; 2010–70.; 2011–31.
Ford Transit		United Kingdom	Van	—	N/A	Used as a low-capacity transport vehicle that can carry up to 4 tonnes of cargo.
MAN TGE		Germany	Van	—	134	Purchase option calls for additional 128 vehicles.
Volkswagen Crafter		Germany	Van	—	90	On 13 September, the 2nd Regional Logistics Base in Warsaw announced the settlement and signing of a contract for the purchase of 90 low-capacity, high-mobility vehicles up to 3,500 kg.
Volkswagen Transporter		Germany	Van	—	267	15 April 2019 the 2nd Regional Logistics Base in Warsaw announced the signing of a contract for the supply of a batch of general-purpose, small-capacity vehicles.

== Ambulances ==
Model	Image	Origin	Type	Variant	Quantity	Details
KTO Ryś		Poland	Armoured ambulance vehicle	Ryś-Med	5	The vehicle is deep modernization of OT-64 SKOT.
WEM Rosomak		Finland Poland (under licence)	Armoured ambulance vehicle	Rosomak-WEM	76/108	Ambulance version of KTO Rosomak.
M113		United States Germany	Tracked armoured ambulance vehicle	M113G2 Krkw Gep	16	Ambulance version of M113.
Tumak-7		United States; Poland	Light utility vehicle ambulance vehicle	Tumak-7	3	M1035A2 version modified in Poland to become ambulance vehicle.
Iveco		Italy Poland	Ambulance truck	M40.12WM	134	4×4 ambulance using Iveco 40E13WM chassis.
SCAM		Italy Poland	Ambulance truck	SCAM SM-50 SCAM SM-55	16 46	Used as a 4×4 ambulance.
Mercedes-Benz Unimog		Germany Poland	Ambulance truck	—	0 (+ 250 on order)	Ordered in October 2025.

== Engineering equipment ==
=== Armoured recovery vehicles ===
Model	Image	Origin	Type	Variant	Quantity	Details
K2	No image available	South Korea	Armoured recovery vehicle	—	0 / 31	81 support tanks ordered in 2025, to be delivered in 2029 - 2031.
K2	No image available	South Korea	Armoured engineering vehicle	—	0 / 25	81 support tanks ordered in 2025, to be delivered in 2029 - 2031.
K2	No image available	South Korea	Armoured vehicle-launched bridge	—	0 / 25	81 support tanks ordered in 2025, to be delivered in 2029 - 2031.
M1150 Assault Breacher Vehicle		United States	Armored Combat Engineering Vehicle	ABV	0 / 25	An annex agreement was signed for the supply of 25 M1150 ABV engineer tanks for the Polish Armed Forces. Deliveries are planned until 2029
M88 Recovery Vehicle		United States	Armoured recovery vehicle	M88A2	33/49	49 ordered. Deliveries: 3 in June 2023.; 9 in November 2023.; 14 in September 2025.; 7 in June 2026.
WZT#WZT-2	Anakonda 2008 (37)	Poland	Armoured recovery vehicle	WZT-2	40	Based on the T-55/T-55A hull.
WZT#WZT-3M	WZT3 MSPO2015	Poland	Armoured recovery vehicle	WZT-3M	29	Based on the PT-91 hull.
Bergepanzer 2		Germany	Armoured recovery vehicle	Bergepanzer 2PL	28	
WPT Mors		Poland	Armoured recovery vehicle		74	
CKPEiRT Hardun		Sweden Poland	Heavy technical rescue and evacuation vehicle.		27	Based on Scania CB 8x8.

=== Armoured vehicle-launched bridges ===
Model	Image	Origin	Type	Variant	Quantity	Details
BLG-67		East Germany Polish People's Republic	Armoured vehicle-launched bridge	BLG-67M2	103	Used by tank and mechanized units. To be replaced by the MG-20 Daglezja-G.
Leopard Biber		West Germany	Armoured vehicle-launched bridge	AVLB Biber	6	To be replaced by the MG-20 Daglezja-G.
MS-20 Daglezja		Poland	Armoured vehicle-launched bridge	MS-20 Daglezja MG-20 Daglezja-G MS-40 Daglezja	12 / 55 2 —	12 prototypes of Daglezja-G and 1 prototype of MS-40 Daglezja were delivered for testing and evaluation. In October 2023 an order was made for 43 units of the MS-20 Daglezja.
M1110 Joint Assault Bridge		United States	Armoured vehicle-launched bridge	M1110	8 / 25	25 on order.

=== Pontoons ===
Model	Image	Origin	Type	Variant	Quantity	Details
PFM		France	Pontoon bridge	PFM F2	1 / 20	13 ordered initially (in 2022). 7 more ordered in February 2024.
PP-64 Wstęga		Poland	Pontoon bridge	AP-64	60	60 Star 266 AP-64 and Star 266 BP-64 trucks used for transport. To be replaced by Daglezja-P (PFM bridge).

=== Repair vehicles ===
Model	Image	Origin	Type	Variant	Quantity	Details
Armament and Electronics Repair Workshop	WozRemontuUzbrojenia	Poland	Armament and electronics repair vehicle	WRUiE	4 / 23	
Artillery Armament Repair Vehicle	WozRemontuUzbrojenia	Poland	Artillery Armament Repair Vehicle	AWRU	12 / 15	
Artillery Armament Repair Vehicle		Poland	Artillery Armament Repair Vehicle	AWA	27 / 45	Artillery armament repair Vehicle mounted on Jelcz 6x6 Truck

=== Engineering equipment ===
Model	Image	Origin	Type	Variant	Quantity	Details
MID Bizon-S		Poland	Engineering-roading machine	MID MID-M	6 1	4 more MIDs will be modernized to MID-M standard.
TRI		Poland	Engineering Reconnaissance Vehicle	TRI Hors TRI-D Durian	77 13	Based on Opal-II.
WRT Rosomak		Finland Poland (under licence)	Technical Reconnaissance Vehicles	WRT	45	ZSMU-1276A RCWS armed with UKM-2000C MG. Vehicle designed to assist with technical problems in the field.
IRS-2		Poland	Engineering Reconnaissance Vehicle	IRS-2 IRS-2M	? / 42	On 6 August 2024 The Military Economic Branch in Toruń announced the launch modernization and repairment of the IRS-2M system. 42 vehicles to be ordered, and with a possible other batch of 22 vehicles. The entire project is to be completed by the end of October 2025.
AOAS Hermes	No image available	Poland	Contamination Computational and Analytical Equipment	AOAS Hermes	13	
PRB	No image available	Poland	Biological reconnaissance vehicle		7	
PTS		Soviet Union	Tracked amphibious medium transporter	PTS-M	~50	A small number in use by the Land Forces, and 50 are in service with the Polish Navy.
Keiler		Germany	Armoured mine clearing vehicle		4	
Bożena		Slovakia Poland	Remote-controlled self-propelled mine roller		14	

=== Minelayers ===
Model	Image	Origin	Type	Variant	Quantity	Details
SPG Kalina	Prezentacja polskiego uzbrojenia i sprzętu wojskowego dla ministra obrony Indii 04	Poland	Minelayer	SPG Kalina	24	
ISM Kroton	SWP2014-0039	Poland	Minelayer	ISM Kroton	6	Based on Opal-II.
Baobab-K	Scattered Mining Vehicle (Baobab-K)	Poland	Minelayer	Baobab-K	5/35	Minelayer system built by Huta Stalowa Wola. Negotiations surrounding the purchase of the vehicle begun in March 2023 (as per Polish Armes Agency). 11 more units ordered on 14 June 2023.

=== Construction machines ===
Model	Image	Origin	Type	Variant	Quantity	Details
UMI 9.50		Poland	Excavator-loader		75	In use since 2004. Orders: Additional batch of batch ordered in June 2021 (agreement signed with Huta Stalowa Wola).; Potential order of 220 armoured backhoe loaders with 2 simulators (trainers) with expected deliveries in 2026 - 2035.; Deliveries: 19 by November 2021
SŁ-34C		Poland	Bulldozer-loader	SŁ-34C SŁ-34B	~28	Developed by Huta Stalowa Wola SŁ-34C have been on the equipment of the Polish Army for several years. Some SŁ-34C and SŁ-34B are being repaired Deliveries: 17 S-34C in 2019; 3 S-34C in June 2021; 8 S-34C in November 2021
K-407C		Poland	Excavator	K-407B K-407C	N/A	On 8 February 2024, the 3rd Regional Logistics Base published information about the launch of the new excavators on an automobile chassis, which will replace the K-407C. New excavators will be on car chassis most likely on Star 266M and will be used by the Polish Land Forces.

=== Bomb disposal ===
Model	Image	Origin	Type	Variant	Quantity	Details
Robot Expert		Poland	Unmanned demining vehicle	Robot Expert	N/A	
Robot Inspektor		Poland	Unmanned demining vehicle	Robot Inspektor	N/A	
Robot Talon IV		United States	Unmanned demining vehicle	Robot Talon IV	N/A	
Forester minex 4530		United States	Metal detector	Forester minex 4530	N/A	
EOD-9		United States	Protective bomb suit		N/A	Latest model of heavy high protection suit.

== Ground drones ==
Model	Image	Origin	Type	Variant	Quantity	Details
Balsa	No image available	Poland	Unmanned reconnaissance vehicle	Engineering robot 1507	53	
RPP	No image available	Poland	Unmanned Engineering vehicle	Engineering robot 1806	52	
Robot Tarantula		Poland	Mobile Unmanned Reconnaissance Vehicle	Robot Tarantula	0/96	Purchase of 130 additional vehicles planned in the near future.

== Air defence ==
=== Anti-air systems ===
==== Shorad & Vshorad ====
Model	Image	Origin	Type	Variant	Quantity	Details
Narew		United Kingdom Poland	CAMM (missile family) / Piorun (missile)	SHORAD / VSHORAD	0/23 batteries (138 launchers)	On 5 September 2023 contracts were signed between the Armament Agency and the PGZ-NAREW Consortium for the acquisition of CAMM-ER missiles and iLauncher missile launchers to equip 23 batteries of short-range air defense missile systems (ZROP-KZ), codenamed Narew. The agreement provides for deliveries in the years 2027-2035
Mała Narew		United Kingdom Poland	CAMM (missile family)	SHORAD	2 batteries (6/6 launchers)	Mała Narew" ("Little Narew") is an interim solution before the delivery of the regular Narew system.
Poprad		Poland	Piorun (missile)	VSHORAD Żubr P	77	77 regular and 2 pre-series units of Poprad were ordered (to the total of 79), 2 pre-series implementation vehicles are used by the Air Force Training Center.
9K33 Osa	SWP2014-0033	Soviet Union Poland	Surface-to-air missile	9K33 Osa-AK 9K33 Osa-AK(M) Osa-P Żądło	64	Some Osa-AKM and Osa-P were donated to Ukraine.
2K12 Kub	KUB MSPO2003 PICT0023	Soviet Union	Surface-to-air missile	2k12 Kub-M	20	20 is the number of TELs. Will be replaced. Some donated to Ukraine.

==== Self-Propelled Anti-Aircraft Guns (SPAAG) ====
Model	Image	Origin	Type	Variant	Quantity	Details
ZU-23-2		Soviet Union Polish People's Republic	ZU-23-2 PZR Grom	ZU-23-2 ZUR-23-2 kg Jodek-G ZUR-23-2SP	268 76 ?	Unknown number of ZU-23-2 were donated to Ukraine.
ZSU-23-4 Shilka		Soviet Union Polish People's Republic	4 × 23 mm 2A7 PZR Grom	ZSU-23-4 Szyłka ZSU-23-4MP Biała	2 20	An unknown number of ZSU-23-4 Shilkas were donated to Ukraine.
Hibneryt		Poland	ZU-23-2 PZR Grom	Hibneryt Hibneryt-KG Hibneryt-P Hibneryt-3	~70	ZUR-23-2S Jod or ZUR-23-2 kg Jodek-G (Hibneryt-KG) mounted on a Star 266 truck. Some Hibneryts are going to be modernized to Hibneryt-P and Hibneryt-3 version.

=== Radars ===
Model	Image	Origin	Type	Variant	Quantity	Details
P-18PL	MSPO23 P18PL radar	Poland	Radiolocation station	P-18PL	0/24	On 19 December 2023, Polish Armaments Agency signed an executive agreement with the PGZ-NAREW Consortium (a grouping of Polish defence industry companies) for delivery and operational support of 24 P-18PL early detection radar sets (RWW). Deliveries are scheduled for 2027-35 period.; Tests were completed in December 2022; Mounted on Jelcz P662D.43 6×6 chassis
NUR-21	No image available	Poland	Radiolocation station	NUR-21	33	Used for detection and tracking of aircraft flying at low altitudes.
NUR-22		Poland	Radiolocation station	NUR-22	10	Based on Tatra 815. Used for detection and tracking of aircraft flying at low altitudes. On 3 September, the 1st Regional Logistics Base announced signing of an agreement with Wojskowe Zakłady Elektroniczne S.A. for repair, upgrade and modification of NUR-22 systems.
NUR-31	Stacja radiolokacyjna NUR-31 "Justyna"	Poland	Radiolocation station	NUR-31 "Justyna"	N/A	Based on Tatra 815
NUR-41	NUR-41 radar in Gdynia 2016 A 124	Poland	Radiolocation station	NUR-31 "Bożena"	N/A	Being gradually withdrawn
Liwiec		Poland	Artillery support radar	Liwiec	10	
Soła		Poland	PESA radiolocation station	Soła	8	Sola radar station mounted on Żubr-P vehicle. Designed to support Poprad and Pilica VSHORAD syatems.
Bystra		Poland	AESA radiolocation station	Bystra	8/38	Bystra AESA radar for VSHORAD and SHORAD systems.; 80 km range.
Breń-2		Poland	Radiolocation station support	Breń-2	N/A	
Przebiśnieg		Poland	Jamming station	Przebiśnieg	2	
Kaktus	RYŚ NR NSZR 02	Poland	Jamming station	MO	1	
MZRiASR	No image available	Poland	Radiolocation station	MZRiASR	N/A	
MSTAR		United Kingdom	Target Acquisition Radar	MSTAR	53	
PGSR-3i Beagle		Hungary	Portable radiolocation station	PGSR-3i Beagle	93	
GCA-2000	No image available	United States	Precision approach radar	GCA-2000/M	9	

== Aircraft ==
=== Attack helicopters ===
Model	Image	Origin	Type	Variant	Quantity	Details
AH-64	MSPO21 AH64 DSC05130 cr	United States	Attack helicopter	AH-64D AH-64E	8 0/96	8 AH-64D will be initially leased from the US Army for training purposes.; Deliveries of AH-64E are scheduled for 2028–2032 period.
Mil Mi-24		Soviet Union	Attack helicopter	Mi-24D Mi-24W	18	At least 12 out of the initial 30 units were donated to Ukraine.

=== Utility helicopters ===
Model	Image	Origin	Type	Variant	Quantity	Details
AW149		Italy Poland	Combat support helicopter	AW149	14/32	32 on order Successor to Mil Mi-2 'Hoplite' and some of the PZL-Świdnik W-3PL
PZL Mi-2		Poland	Utility helicopter	N/A	41	Multi-role helicopter Planned end of operation: 2026
Mi-8/17	Samodzielna Grupa Powietrzna PKW Afghanistan (03)	Soviet Union	Utility helicopter	Mi-8/17	27	
PZL W-3 Sokół		Poland	Utility helicopter	W-3W Sokól W-3WA Sokół W-3PL Głuszec W-3AE Sokół W-3A PSOT W-3RR Procjon	10 13 7 2 1 3	

=== Training helicopters ===
Model	Image	Origin	Type	Variant	Quantity	Details
PZL Mi-2		Poland	Rotorcraft trainer	Mil Mi-2	2	Planned end of operation: 2026

=== Unmanned aerial vehicles ===
Model	Image	Origin	Type	Role	Variant	Quantity	Details
Defense Orbiter	Orbiter PICT0105	Israel	Small UAV Fixed-wing	ISTAR Intelligence, surveillance, and reconnaissance	Orbiter 2B	44	
Boeing Insitu ScanEagle		United States	Small UAV Fixed-wing	ISTAR Intelligence, surveillance, and reconnaissance	N/A	10	
PGZ-19 Orlik	No image available	Poland	Small UAV Fixed-wing	ISTAR Intelligence, surveillance, and reconnaissance	PGZ-19RA	0/40	First Orlik drones planned to be delivered in 2023.
WB Electronics FlyEye		Poland	Small UAV Fixed-wing	ISTAR Intelligence, surveillance, and reconnaissance	3.6	68/258	Close-in reconnaissance unmanned aerial vehicle. 1x set: 4 x UAV, ground control station .
WB Electronics FT5-Łoś	No image available	Poland	Small unmanned aerial vehicle	ISTAR Intelligence, surveillance, and reconnaissance	N/A	20/400	Artillery reconnaissance. Ordered as a part of Gladius programme.
Wizjer	No image available	Poland	Small unmanned aerial vehicle	ISTAR Intelligence, surveillance, and reconnaissance	NeoX 2	76/100	25 sets of 4 drones each ordered in 2021, to be delivered between 2024 and 2027.
WB Electronics Warmate		Poland	Small unmanned aerial vehicle	Loitering munition	Warmate	100/1000	
WB Electronics Warmate		Poland	Small unmanned aerial vehicle	Loitering munition	Warmate 2	N/A	
WB Electronics Warmate		Poland	Small unmanned aerial vehicle	Loitering munition	Warmate 3	360 sets	

=== Reconnaissance and strike system ===
Model	Image	Origin	Type	Variant	Quantity	Details
GLADIUS		Poland	Reconnaissance and strike system	GLADIUS	3/16sets	The GLADIUS system is designed to accurately strike important targets at distances of over 100 km from the launch point.; To be delivered later in 2024.

== Planned purchases ==
Model/Programme	Image	Origin	Type	Variant	Quantity	Details
Lampart	No image available	Poland	Combat uniform	Lampart	N/A	Currently used by 5th Podhale Rifle Battalion of 18th mechanized Brigade for testing purposes.; Will replace wz.1993 Pantera Combat uniform.
Hełm HBT-02		Poland	Combat helmet	HBT-02	N/A	The HBT-02 absorbs up to 90 percent of the energy of a high-speed impact. It is a "low-cut" helmet, with a side line covering the ears. This is the main feature that distinguishes it from HP-05 helmet. HBT-02 helmet has completed qualification tests, has been tested by soldiers of the 18th Mechanized Division. First copies to be delivered in 2025. Will the HBT-02 is to replace older models used by the Polish Army. Developed by Maskpol S.A.
MP-6T	No image available	Poland	Gas mask	MP-6T	N/A	The launch of serial production of the latest MP-6T gas mask is in development. The gas mask is equipped with a panoramic viewfinder that allows you to install overlays to protect the eyes of operators against the operation of the laser light. An additional element characterizing this design is an external speech amplifier with the possibility of a sub-enabled to a personal radio station.
MSBS Grot	No image available	Poland	5.56mm NATO modular rifle	Grot A3	N/A	Presented at GROTowisko conference 22–23 June 2024. Improved version of the Grot rifle, code named Grot A3.
Moskit	No image available	Poland	Anti-tank guided missile	Moskit-LR Moskit-SR	N/A	A development program initiated by the Military Institute of Armament Technology in 2018, most likely a clone of Spike missile system with similar technical specifications.
Pirat		Poland Ukraine	Anti-tank guided missile	Pirat	N/A	Semi-active laser homing ATGM jointly developed by Mesko and Luch Design Bureau and based on some of the components of the RK-3 Corsar.; On 31 January 2023, Krzysztof Płatek, the spokesman for the Polish Armaments Agency, announced that the first test batch of the Pirat missiles will be ordered in the following months.
K9PL	No image available	South Korea Poland	155 mm L/52 self-propelled howitzer	K9PL	0/606	606 155mm K9PL Self-Propelled Howitzers are to be produced in Poland starting from 2026 onwards.
K2 Black Panther	No image available	South Korea Poland	120 mm L/55 Main battle tank	K2PL	820	Production of the K2PL in Poland is expected to start in 2026
Ratel	No image available	Poland	Tracked Infantry Fighting Vehicle	Heavy Infantry Fighting Vehicle	700	Will use a completely new chassis and ZSSW-30 turret.; Designed with a combat weight of approximately 45 tons, making it one of the heaviest infantry fighting vehicles currently under development.; Intended to provide very high levels of ballistic and mine protection.; Framework agreement signed on 14 August 2023; first deliveries planned in 2025; expected to be ready for testing in 2026.
Serwal	No image available	Poland	Wheeled Armoured personnel carrier	SERWAL 4x4	N/A	New Combat Armoured personnel carrier along with a logistics and training vehicles.; The delivery will take place in the years 2028–2035
Heron	HSW Heron 20240903	Poland Czech Republic	Wheeled armored vehicle Command vehicles	Heron 6x6	N/A	Presented at 13th International Scientific Conference EKSPLOBALIS_2024; Based on the TADEAS 6×6 armored vehicle (Tatra Defense Armored Solution), using the Tatra Force T 815-7 family chassis
Waran		Poland Czech Republic	Tactical multi-role vehicle	Waran 4x4	N/A	Equipped with a 7.62 mm UKM 2000 machine gun on a Remotely Controlled Weapons Module (ZSMU) A3, it is integrated with both the ZZKO Topaz system and the Obra-3 passive defense system, which is equipped with smoke grenade launchers.; Based on the Tatra 815-7 chassis
Ottokar Brzoza	No image available	Poland Czech Republic	Tank destroyer	Ottokar Brzoza	N/A	Equipped with Brimstone missile
M1150 Assault Breacher Vehicle	A US Army M1150 assault breacher vehicle during an exercise in 2014	United States	Armored Combat Engineering Vehicle	ABV	25	Mine-clearing and engineering vehicle using M1 Abrams hull. Intended for the 18th Mechanized Division.
M120G Rak	M69 Rak mortar turret mounted on the Borsuk IFV chassis; MSPO 24 defense expo	Poland	120 mm self-propelled tracked mortar	SMG	N/A	During the 29th International Defence Industry Exhibition in Kielce, 7–10 September 2023, Huta Stalowa Wola (HSW), presented a new version of the tracked 120 mm self-propelled mortar M120G RAK on a modified Light Tracked Chassis LPG.
M69	Front view of the M69 Rak mortar turret mounted on the Borsuk IFV chassis; MSPO 24 defense expo	Poland	120 mm self-propelled turret system	M69	N/A	Currently being modernaized to meet the requirements of the modern battlefield.; Huta Stalowa Wola is finalizing this program. The planned date of handing over the last vehicles with a modernized charging system is set to be at the end of April 2024.
Oset	No image available	Poland	Tracked command vehicle	Oset	N/A	Specialist vehicle for Borsuk (infantry fighting vehicle).; Will be Produced along with Borsuk (infantry fighting vehicle).
Żuk	No image available	Poland	Tracked reconnaissance vehicle	Żuk	N/A	Specialist vehicle for Borsuk (infantry fighting vehicle).; Will be Produced along with Borsuk (infantry fighting vehicle).
Gekon	No image available	Poland	Technical support vehicle	Gekon	N/A	Specialist vehicle for Borsuk (infantry fighting vehicle).; Will be Produced along with Borsuk (infantry fighting vehicle).
Ares	No image available	Poland	Contamination reconnaissance transporter	Ares	N/A	Specialist vehicle for Borsuk (infantry fighting vehicle).; Will be Produced along with Borsuk (infantry fighting vehicle).
Gotem	No image available	Poland	Medical evacuation vehicle	Gotem	N/A	Specialist vehicle for Borsuk (infantry fighting vehicle).; Will be Produced along with Borsuk (infantry fighting vehicle).
Jelcz 883.57	Jelcz 883.57	Poland	Military truck	Jelcz 883.57	N/A	Seen at MSPO 2023; 3rd generation truck created intended for Homar and Wisła programs, but over time they may become the basic off-road vehicles of the Polish Army.
P-18PL	MSPO23 P18PL radar	Poland	Radiolocation station	P-18PL	24	In the years 2027–2035, Polish defense industry companies grouped in the PGZ-NAREW consortium are to deliver 24 P-18PL early warning radar sets to the Polish Armed Forces.; On 19 December 2023, the Armaments Agency signed an executive agreement with the PGZ-NAREW consortium for the delivery and support of the operation of 24 P-18PL early detection radar sets (RWW).; Tests were completed in December 2022; Mounted on Jelcz P662D.43 6×6 chassis
AH-64		United States	Attack helicopter	AH-64E	96	Deliveries of AH-64E are scheduled for 2028–2032.
AW101	Agusta-Westland AW-101 (ZR288), Radom Air Show, 20230826 1514 9519	Italy	Heavy-lift helicopter	AW101	22	Intended to enhance heavy-lift capabilities of the 25th Air Cavalry Brigade.; On 10 August 2023, the Armament Agency of the Ministry of National Defense sent an invitation to WSK PZL-Świdnik part of the Italian company Leonardo regarding the acquisition of another 22 AgustaWestland AW101 heavy multi-role helicopters for the Polish Army.

== See also ==
- List of equipment of Polish Territorial Defense Forces
- List of equipment of Polish Special Forces
- List of equipment of Polish Air Force
- List of ships of the Polish Navy
- Modernization of the Polish Armed Forces

== Sources ==
- International Institute for Strategic Studies (12 February 2025). The Military Balance 2025. London: Routledge. ISBN 9781003630760.
