= ZWD-3 =

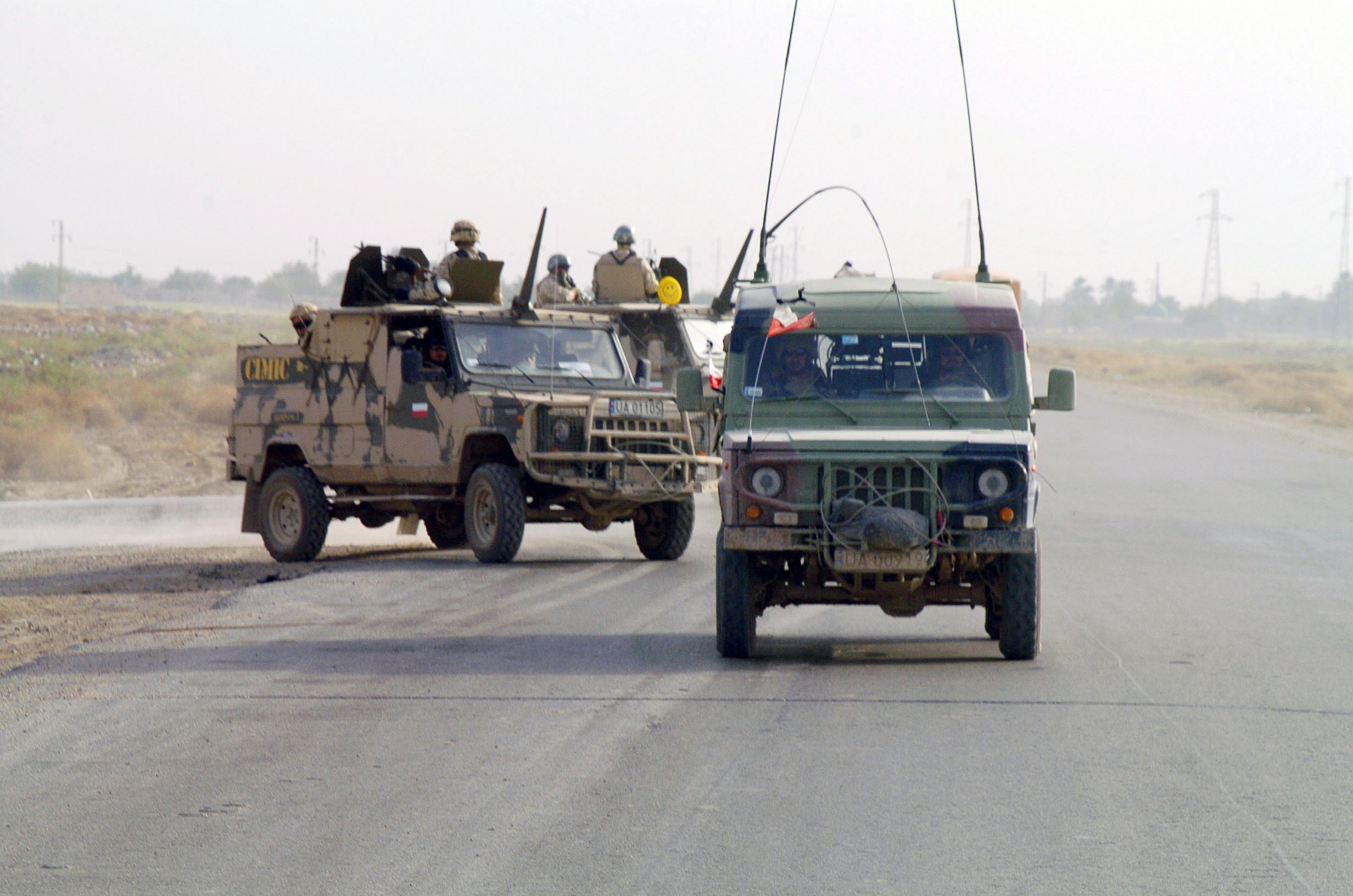
- Type: Wheeled all-terrain command vehicle
- Place of origin: Poland

Service history
- Used by: Polish Land Forces

Production history
- Produced: 1999 - ?

Specifications
- Crew: 4

ZWD-3 (Polish: Zautomatyzowany wóz dowodzenia, lit.'Automated command vehicle') is a Polish command vehicle built on the Honker chassis. Together with the ZWD-1 and ZWD-2 vehicles, it forms the IRYS 2000 system. Entered service in 2001. The ZWD-3 command vehicle is intended for light unit battalions.

== Development ==
The prototype was constructed in 1998 at the Military Communication Works No. 2 in Czernica in cooperation with the Communications Board of the Border Guard and the Military University of Technology. The vehicle bodywork was also carried out there. By 2000, about 30 of them had been built.

The ZWD-3 command vehicles were produced in two versions with different equipment:

- Automated Command Vehicle in the assembly version 1 ZWD-3 SO-1-1 – a total of 39 units were introduced into service.
- Automated Command Vehicle in the assembly version 2 ZWD-3 SO-1-1 – a total of 2 units were introduced into service.

The vehicle is intended for commanders and chiefs of staff of light unit battalions (e.g. mountain and airmobile). The basic means of communication installed in the vehicles are two VHF RRC-9500 radio stations from the PR4G family with a power of 50 W. They have two workstations. The vehicles do not have a power generator, and all equipment is operated from the car's batteries. If necessary, they are recharged by an independent generator powered by the vehicle's engine. ZWD-3 vehicles are adapted to cooperate with Łowcza and Topaz vehicles.

== See also ==
- Waran
- Heron
- Universal Track Carrier LPG

== Bibliography ==
- "ZWD-3" (in Polish).
- "SIECIOCENTRYCZNY "IRYS 2000"". www.kenbit.pl (in Polish). Archived from the original on 2016-03-04.
- Szulc, Tomasz (2000). "Taktyczne samobieżne stanowiska dowodzenia dla Wojska Polskiego". Nowa Technika Wojskowa. Warszawa: Magnum-X Sp. z o.o: 18–19. ISSN 1230-1655.
