= MN-123 mine =

Polish anti-tank mine

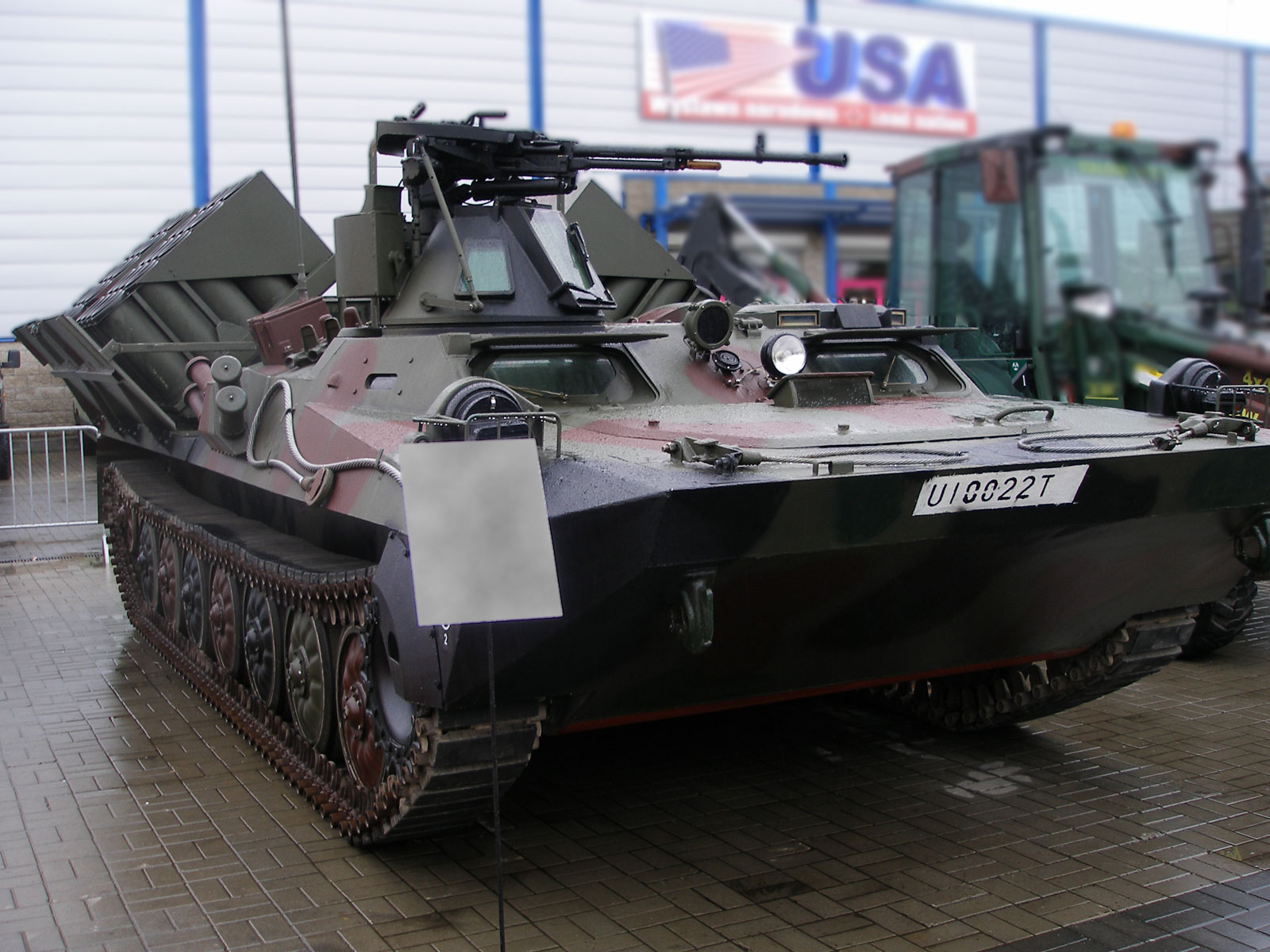
Polish mine laying vehicle, Kroton.

The MN-123 is a Polish scatterable anti-tank mine. The mine is a flat cylinder, with a bevelled edge. It is normally deployed from a ground vehicle, using a dispensing system holding 80 mines. The mine can also be manually laid. Like the MN-121 mine, it uses a magnetic influence fuze which detects when a vehicle passes over it. It also has an anti-handling device. Both faces of the mine have a Misznay Schardin effect shaped charge, which is reportedly able to penetrate 60 millimeters of armour at an offset of 0.3 meters.

== Specifications ==
- Height: 90 mm
- Diameter: 180 mm
- Weight: 3.5 kg
