= Lampart camouflage =

Polish camouflage scheme

Lampart
- Type: Military camouflage
- Place of origin: Poland

Service history
- In service: 2024 – present
- Used by: See Users

Production history
- Designed: 2015 -
- Manufacturer: Maskpol

The Lampart, (Polish: Lampart, lit. 'Leopard') nickname "bigos", is a Polish camouflage pattern. It will replace wz.1993 Pantera Combat uniform in the future.

== History ==
In 2015, the Military Institute of Engineering Technology began a process to introduce a new camouflage for the Polish Army to replace wz.1993 Pantera Combat uniform as part of the Tytan project.

In 2017, during MSPO exhibition, the rights to lampart were purchased by Maskpol S.A. The Polish Ministry of Defense announced in September 2022 that field testing of a new camouflage design had started with the goal to be implemented on a new combat uniform and field equipment system.

Field testing was conducted by the 21st Podhale Rifle Brigade in late 2023, which indicated that the pattern would be shortly approved for official integration into the Polish military. It was also tested by soldiers from the 5th Podhale Riflemen Battalion from Przemyśl as well from 18th Mechanized Division tested lampart (KBT-01) and helmets (HBT-02) were also provided for tests.

== Design ==
The pattern consists of dark green, brown, and black spots that were printed on an olive background to create the pattern. Camouflage has been utilized on overseas missions. A desert version of the Forest Panther — the Desert Panther — was also developed.

This camouflage has a much more disruptive appearance than the wz. 93 Pantera. Two versions of the pattern were originally developed, one for use in spring and summer, and another for use in autumn and winter. Although the hues of each color were changed for each seasonal design, both patterns retain the same shapes and basic black, brown, light and dark green color combination.

== Users ==
Poland

== See also ==
- Wz. 93 Pantera
- Wz. 89 Puma

== Bibliography ==
- "Sztab Generalny: trwają testy nowego kamuflażu dla żołnierzy Wojska Polskiego". forsal.pl (in Polish). 29 November 2024.
