= Opal (armoured personnel carrier) =

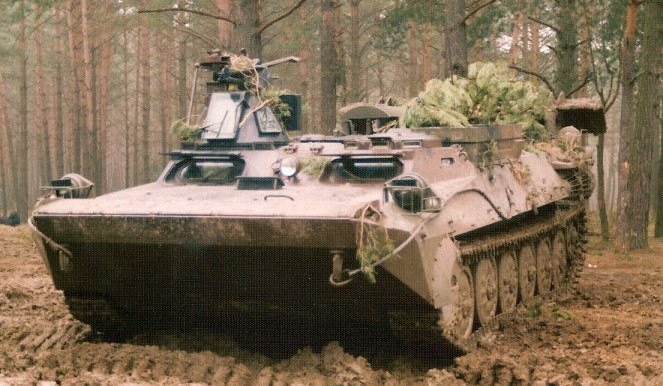
- WPT Mors
- Type: Armoured personnel carrier
- Place of origin: Poland

Service history
- Used by: Polish Land Forces

Production history
- Designer: HSW S.A.

Specifications
- Mass: 11,900 kg
- Length: 6.45 m
- Width: 2.86 m
- Height: 1.865 m
- Crew: 2 (+ 11 passengers)
- Main armament: 12.7mm NSVT machine-gun
- Engine: SW680 diesel 245 hp
- Power/weight: 20 hp/tonne
- Suspension: Torsion bar

The Opal-I is a multi-purpose fully amphibious armoured personnel carrier developed and produced by HSW S.A. in Poland. APC is a development of MT-LB that was produced in HSW under licence. Major changes are reworked nose section and fitted propellers for better floating speed and manoeuvrability, new turret with 12.7 mm NSVT machine-gun instead of old one with 7.62 PKT and powered-up engine. Opal-II is a stretched variant with longer chassis with 7 road wheels on each side, like the 2S1 and MT-LBu and 300 hp (220 kW) SW680T engine.

== Variants ==
=== WPT Mors ===
(WPT for Wóz Pogotowia Technicznego - lit. Technical Support Vehicle) - armoured recovery and repair vehicle with light crane, hydraulic dozerblade, welding equipment and an NBC detection system. The vehicle is a basic support vehicle of mechanized battalions equipped with BMP-1 IFV in Polish Land Forces.

=== TRI Hors ===
(TRI for Transporter Rozpoznania Inżynieryjnego - lit. Engineering Reconnaissance Vehicle) - engineering vehicle with basic equipment. In use with Polish Land Forces.

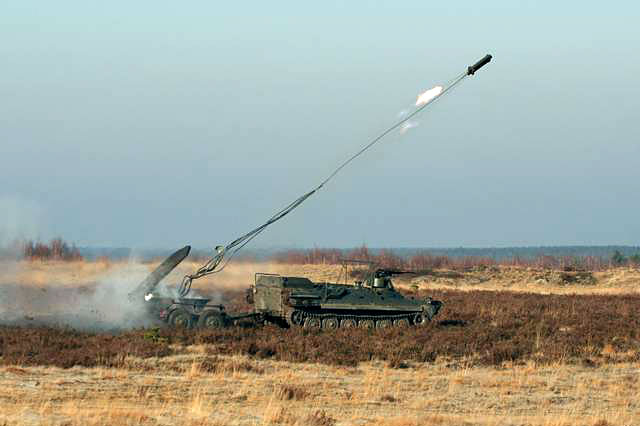
Durian firing UZR-3 mine clearing system

=== TRI-D Durian ===
It's TRI Hors additionally equipped with trailer-mounted UZR-3 mine clearing system. In use with Polish Land Forces.

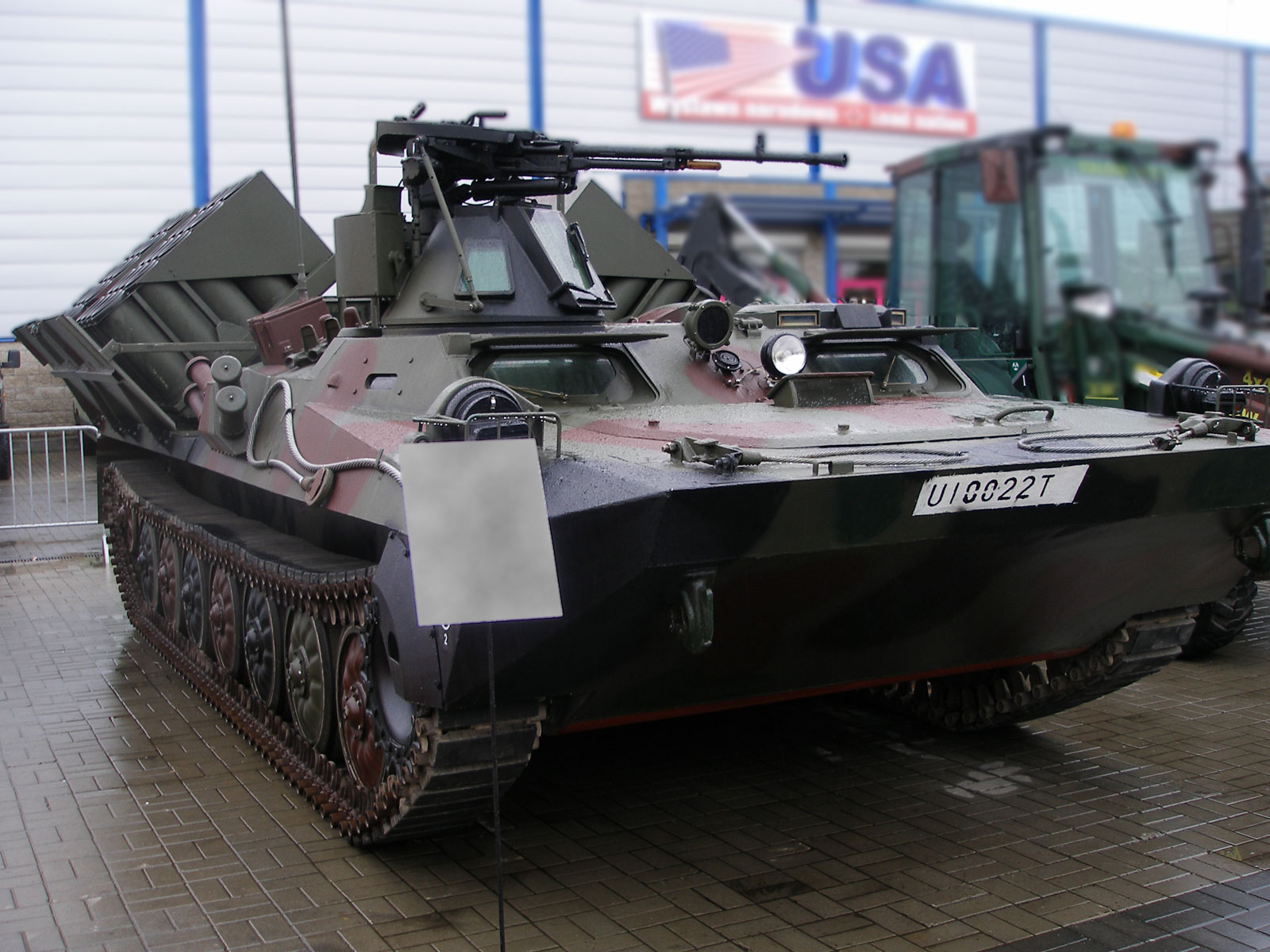
Kroton

=== ISM Kroton ===
(ISM for Inżynieryjny System Minowania – lit. Engineer Minelaying System, Kroton is Polish for Croton) - Opal-II based engineer vehicle with mine-scattering system UMN mounted on a cargo bed. UMN consists of 4 launchers, each with 20 launch containers for anti-personnel or anti-tank mines. The ISM has a crew of 2 and a combat weight of 15.25 tonnes. It entered service with Polish Land Forces in 2004.

=== WEM Lotos ===
Armoured ambulance vehicle. In service with Polish Land Forces.

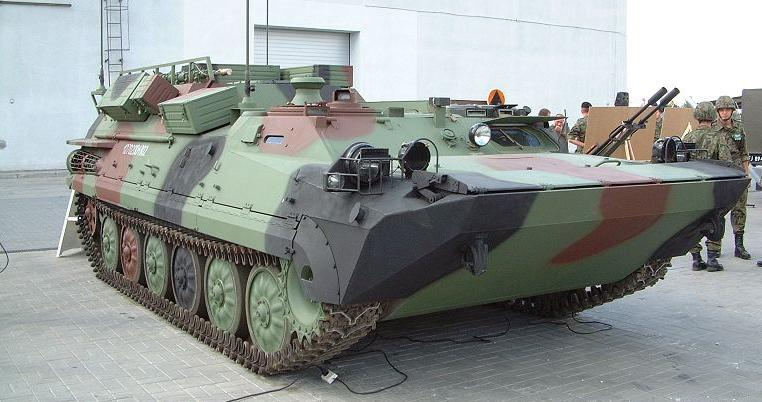
Łowcza-3

=== ZWD-10R Łowcza-3 ===
(ZWD for Zautomatyzowany Wóz Dowodzenia – lit. Automatic Command Vehicle) - Opal-I based air defence command vehicle equipped with Łowcza system. The troop compartment section of vehicle is higher than in standard vehicle. Also known as LA-3. Vehicle is used by Polish Land Forces.

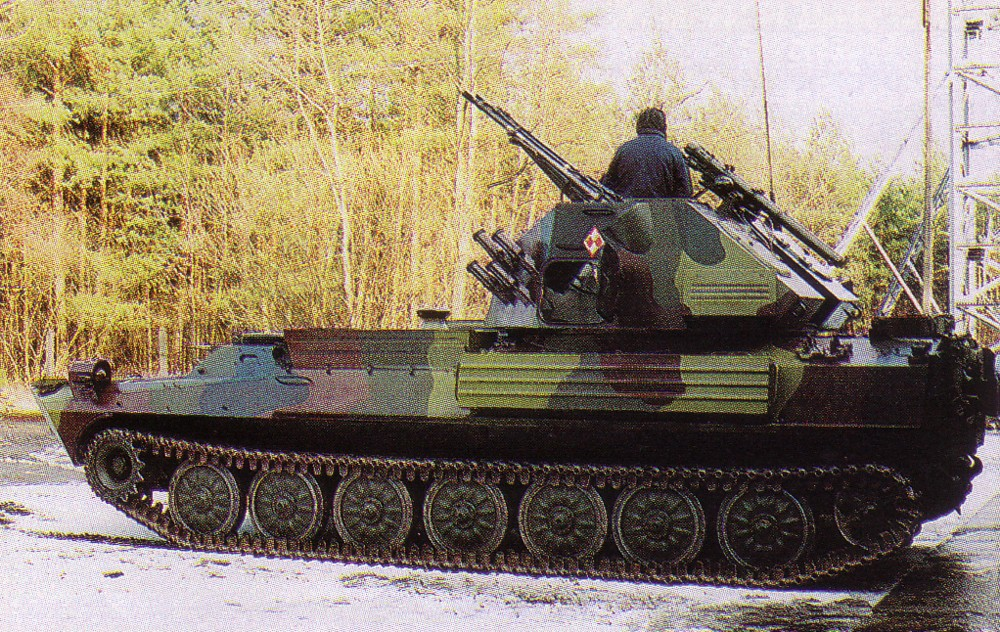
Sopel

=== LSPZRA Sopel ===
(LSPZRA for lekki samobieżny przeciwlotniczy zestaw rakietowo-artyleryjski – lit. light, self-propelled, anti-aircraft, combined gun and missile system; Sopel is Polish for Icicle) - air defence variant armed with twin 23 mm cannon and two 9M32M "Strela-2M" surface to air missiles. Vehicle designed as air-defence vehicle for mechanized units. Only prototype.

=== LSPZRA Stalagmit ===
(Stalagmit is Polish for Stalagmite) - development of Sopel, based on Opal-II, armed with ELOP turret with two 23 mm Model-4216 guns and 4 Grom surface to air missiles. This variant was equipped with more advanced guiding systems. Only prototype.

=== Bor ===
Ammunition re-supply vehicle for artillery units. Only prototype.
