= Star 944 =

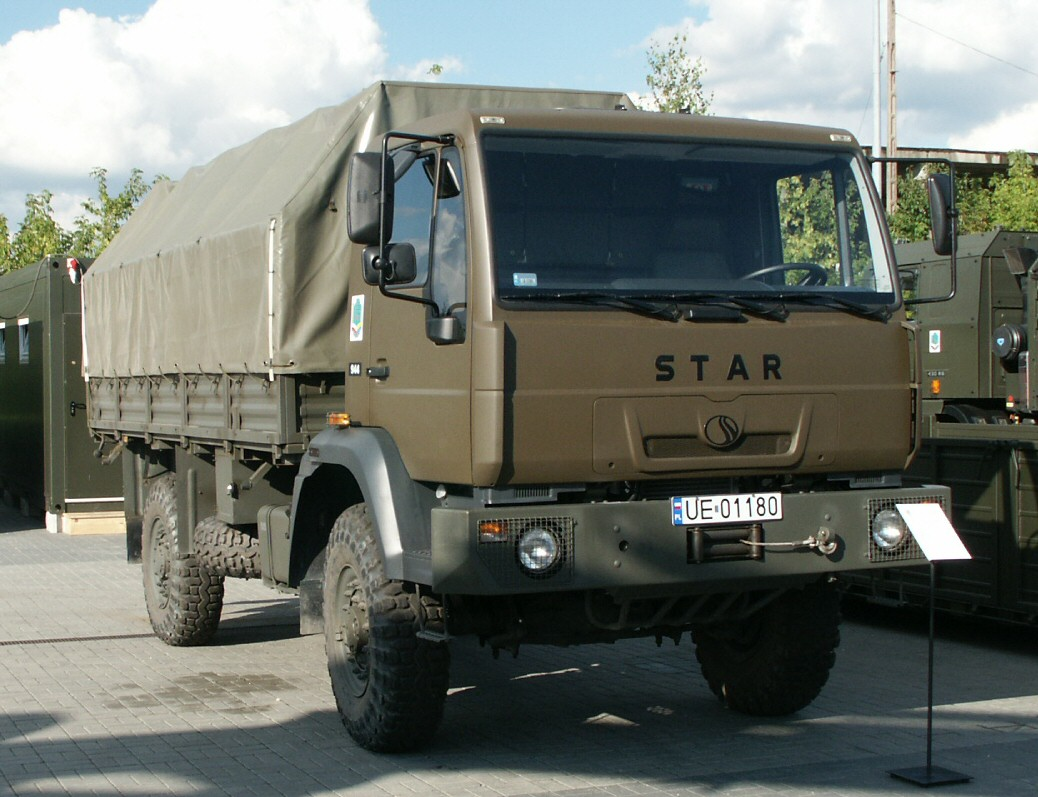

Overview
- Manufacturer: FSC Star
- Also called: Hiena
- Production: 2000-2007
- Assembly: Poland

Body and chassis
- Class: 4x4 Truck
- Body style: 2-door standard cab

Powertrain
- Engine: 4,6L V4 D 0824
- Transmission: 6-speed manual

Dimensions
- Length: 6370 mm
- Width: 2540 mm
- Height: 3250 mm
- Curb weight: 5700kg

Chronology
- Predecessor: Star 266
- Successor: Star 1466

The Star 944 is a Polish 4x4 truck designed for transport of cargo and personnel. Created by Starachowice-based Star Trucks company.

Successor to the Star 744, also intended to partially replace the Star 266. The premiere of the new vehicle took place in 1999.

It was powered by diesel engines with an output of 150 HP (maximum torque 580 Nm), and later 180 HP (650 Nm).

== History ==
The vehicle was approved for the Polish Armed Forces as part of the new concept of the road transport structure of December 1998. It belonged to the category of medium-duty tactical and high-mobility trucks, similar to its predecessor Star 266, which, however, was replaced by heavier vehicles a dozen or so years later. There were basic versions of the 944K with a short day cab and the 944DK with a long four-door cab. Box or special bodies were used. In 2000, the Polish Army purchased 3 trucks of this model, in 2001 81, in 2002 185, in 2003 120, in 2004 197, in 2005 169, in 2006 155. The Star 944 became the basic newly purchased vehicle used to transport soldiers, supplementing the previously most numerous old Star 266, to a lesser extent it served as a chassis for special bodies. Despite systematic purchases by the Polish armed forces, in relatively the largest quantities of trucks, the MAN concern decided to end the assembly of trucks of its own design at the Star plant by 2007. In 2007, the army received the last 55 vehicles. The total number of Star 944 trucks produced in the years 2000-2007 is 910 units.

== Star 944 Hiena ==
For the needs of the mission in Iraq, work began in 2004 on the modernization of the Star truck. The new version adapted for combat patrols was designated Star 944 Hiena.

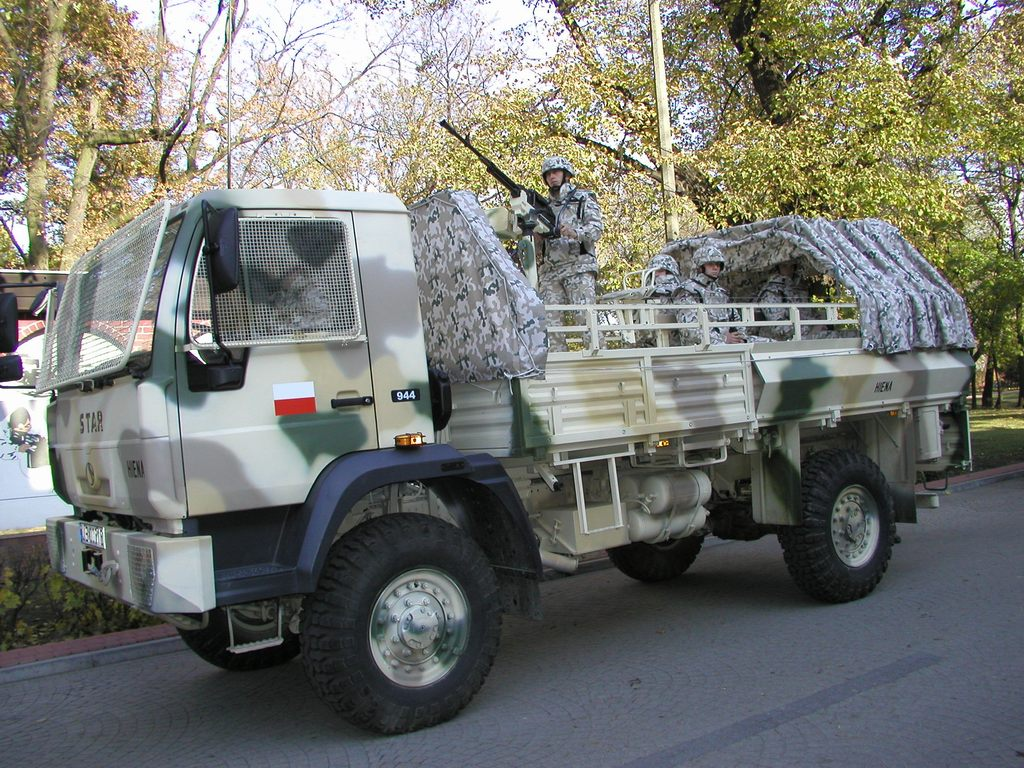
Star 944 Hiena

The basic modification was the introduction of armament - a 12.7 mm NSW machine gun. The rifle was placed on a pillar base mounted in the front part of the cargo box. Along with the base, a seat for the gunner and mounts for ammunition boxes were introduced. In addition, the vehicle was adapted to transport an infantry squad - benches for soldiers (sitting back to back) were mounted in the rear part of the box. Partial armor was also introduced - steel (reinforced with composite material) covers were mounted to protect against light mines, and also partially against small arms projectiles and shrapnel. The bottom of the box, the floor and the door of the cab were lined with LIM-3 carpet. In addition, it was painted in desert colors.

== Star 944P ==
Star 944P is a version of Star 944 with special armour installed at level 1 STANAG 4569. This variant was developed in the 3rd District Technical Workshops from Nowy Dwór Mazowiecki in 2007–2008. A large part of the solutions was borrowed from the Hibneryt-P anti-aircraft system presented at the MSPO 2007 trade fair, where an armoured version of the Star 266M truck was used.

At the end of 2007, the developed prototype was subjected to traction tests at the Military Institute of Armoured and Automotive Technology in Sulejówek. The results of these tests were promising, due to the high engine power the vehicle's performance did not decrease significantly. Later, the vehicle was subjected to ballistic strength assessment, consisting solely of theoretical determination of the armour strength.

Positive test results resulted in an order for 20 Star 944P vehicles from the 3rd OWT. Twelve of them were sent to the Afghanistan and two to the in Chad.
