= PWA Aero =

Polish mobility airmobile vehicle

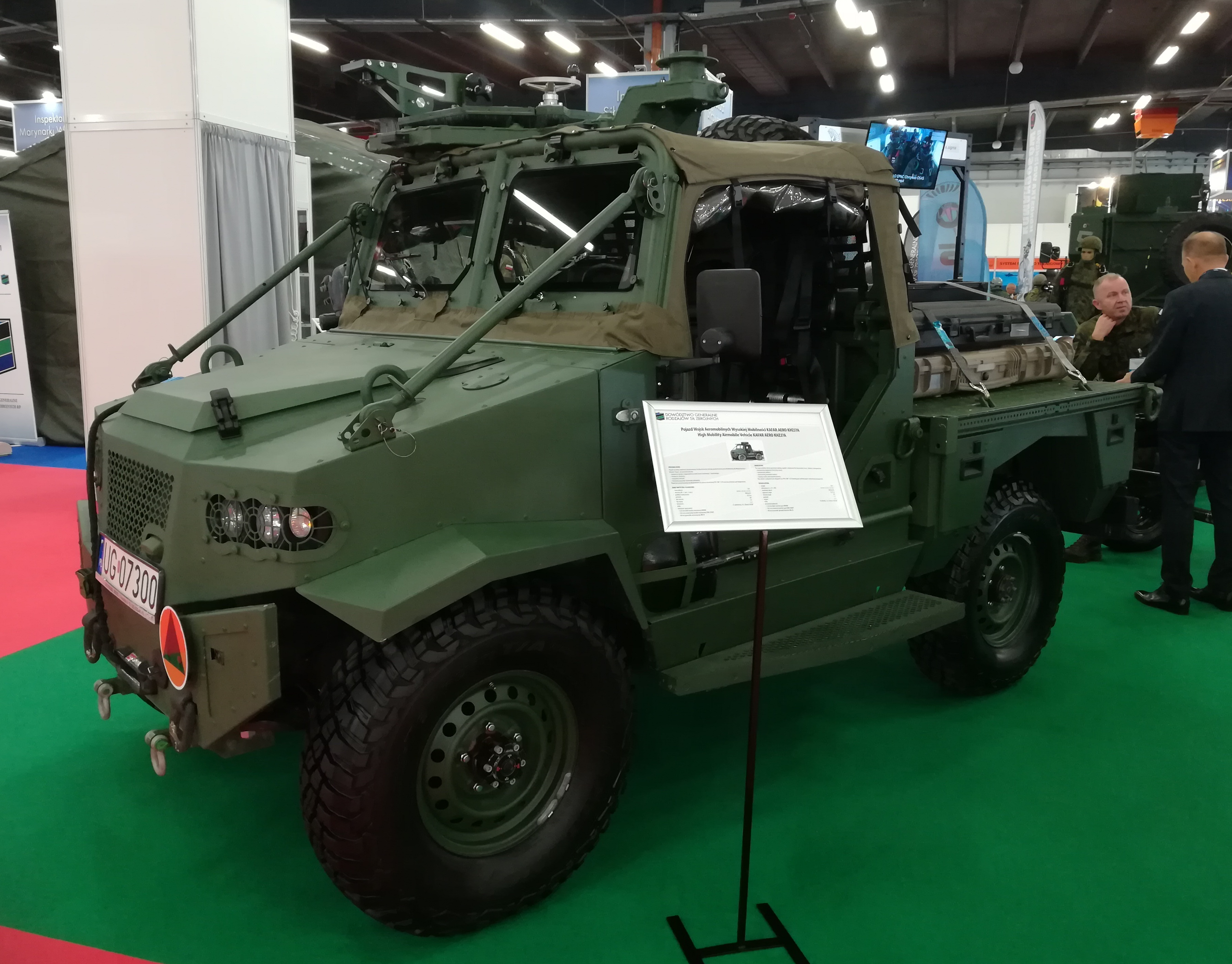
- PWA Aero at International Defence Industry Exhibition 2022 in Kielce, Poland.
- Type: High Mobility Airmobile Vehicle
- Place of origin: Poland

Service history
- In service: 2019-
- Used by: Polish Land Forces; Polish Special Forces

Production history
- Manufacturer: KAFAR Bartłomiej Sztukiert
- Developed from: Toyota Land Cruiser HZJ 71,74
- Produced: 2018
- No. built: 80

Specifications
- Mass: 1800 kg
- Length: 3,6 m
- Width: 2,1 m
- Height: 2.3 m (1.35 m after folding the cage)
- Crew: 2

PWA AERO (Aeromobile Troops Vehicle AERO) is a Polish off-road vehicle designed for airborne units, adapted for parachute drop for a transport aircraft. Built on the basis of Toyota Land Cruiser HZJ 71,74.

== Development ==
On December 16, 2018, the Armament Inspectorate signed a contract for the delivery of 55 PWA AERO vehicles and 105 PS AERO TR trailers, which are towed by cars. The contract includes an option for the delivery of another 25 cars and 55 trailers. The first 15 cars and the same number of trailers were handed over to the 16th Airborne Battalion from Kraków in December 2019, and in November of the same year, the Armed Forces received another batch of vehicles. The vehicle is manufactured by a consortium consisting of: KAFAR Bartłomiej Sztukiert (leader), HIBNERYT, Auto Podlasie and the Auto Special company. In November 2020, the exercise of the option right was confirmed, thus the ordered number of vehicles increased to 80 and 120 trailers. By November 2022, the delivery of the vehicles had been completed.

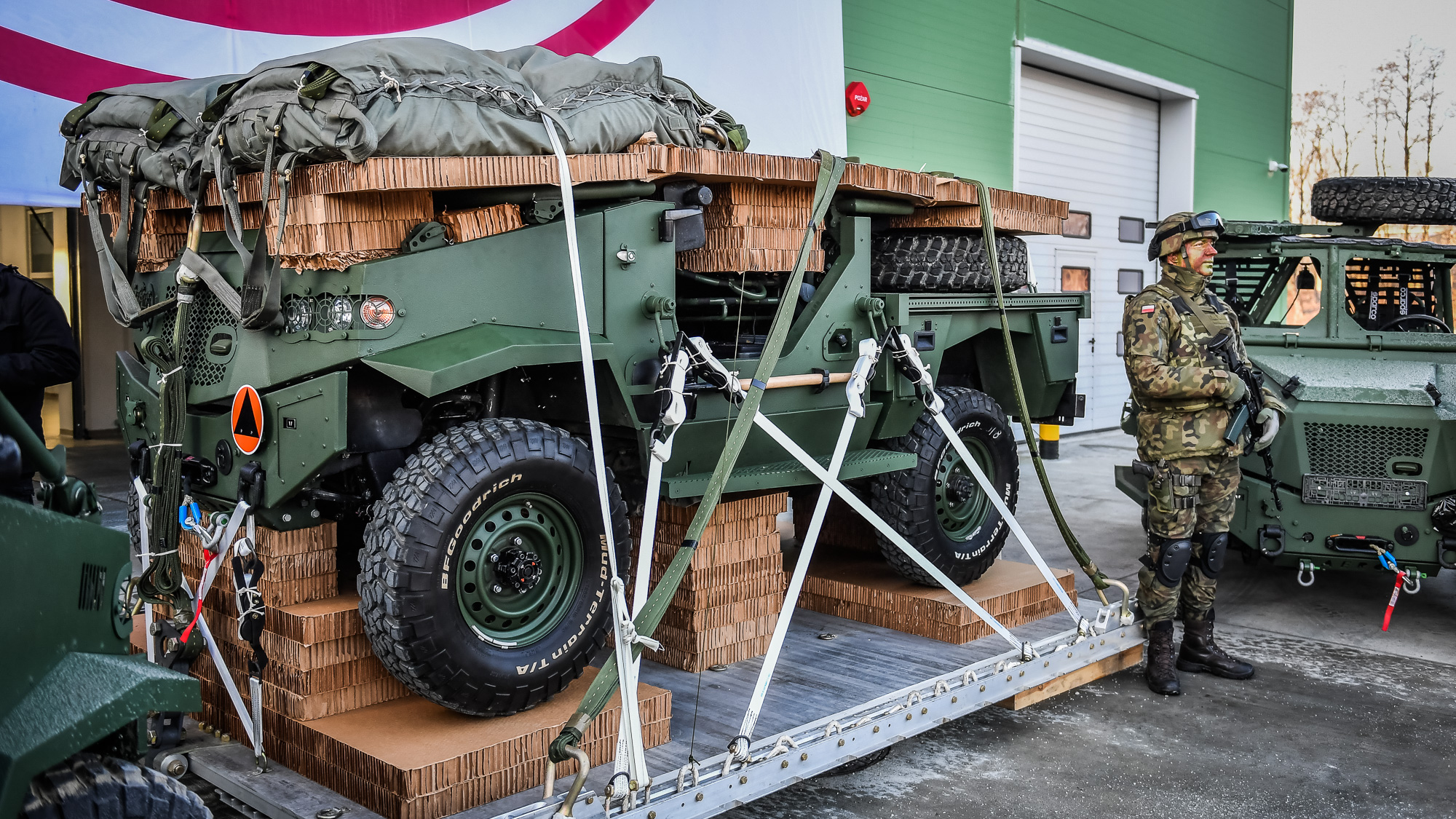
Transfer of the first vehicles to the 6th Airborne Brigade

== Construction ==
High mobility Aero 4x4 vehicles, based on the modernized chassis of the Toyota Land Cruiser J70 off-road vehicle with a short wheelbase. The vehicles is 3.6 m long and weigh 1.8 t, and the permissible total weight is 3.5 t. The vehicle is powered by a KZ series diesel engine with a capacity of 4.2 l and a power of 131 HP (96 kW), working with a 5-speed manual gearbox. This provides a maximum speed of up to 100 km/h on a paved road. The load capacity is 1.2 t. The vehicle is equipped with two electric winches with a pulling capacity of 3.5 and 2 t. AERO can tow specially designed PS AERO TR trailers with two trailers or a trailer and a light artillery piece. AERO is adapted for dropping from Lockheed C-130E Hercules and CASA C-295M transport aircraft.

== Variants ==
- TAero is an unmanned ground platform based on the PWA Aero, capable of operating autonomously or under operator control. It also features an auxiliary electric motor to enhance stealth.
- Bluszcz is a remotely operated minelaying system developed on the TAero chassis. It is capable of deploying up to 20 mine cassettes, each containing five MN-123 anti-tank mines, and can establish minefields 30 to 90 meters wide. Additionally, equipped with optical and infrared cameras, it may also be used for reconnaissance purposes.
