= Breń-2 =

Breń 2
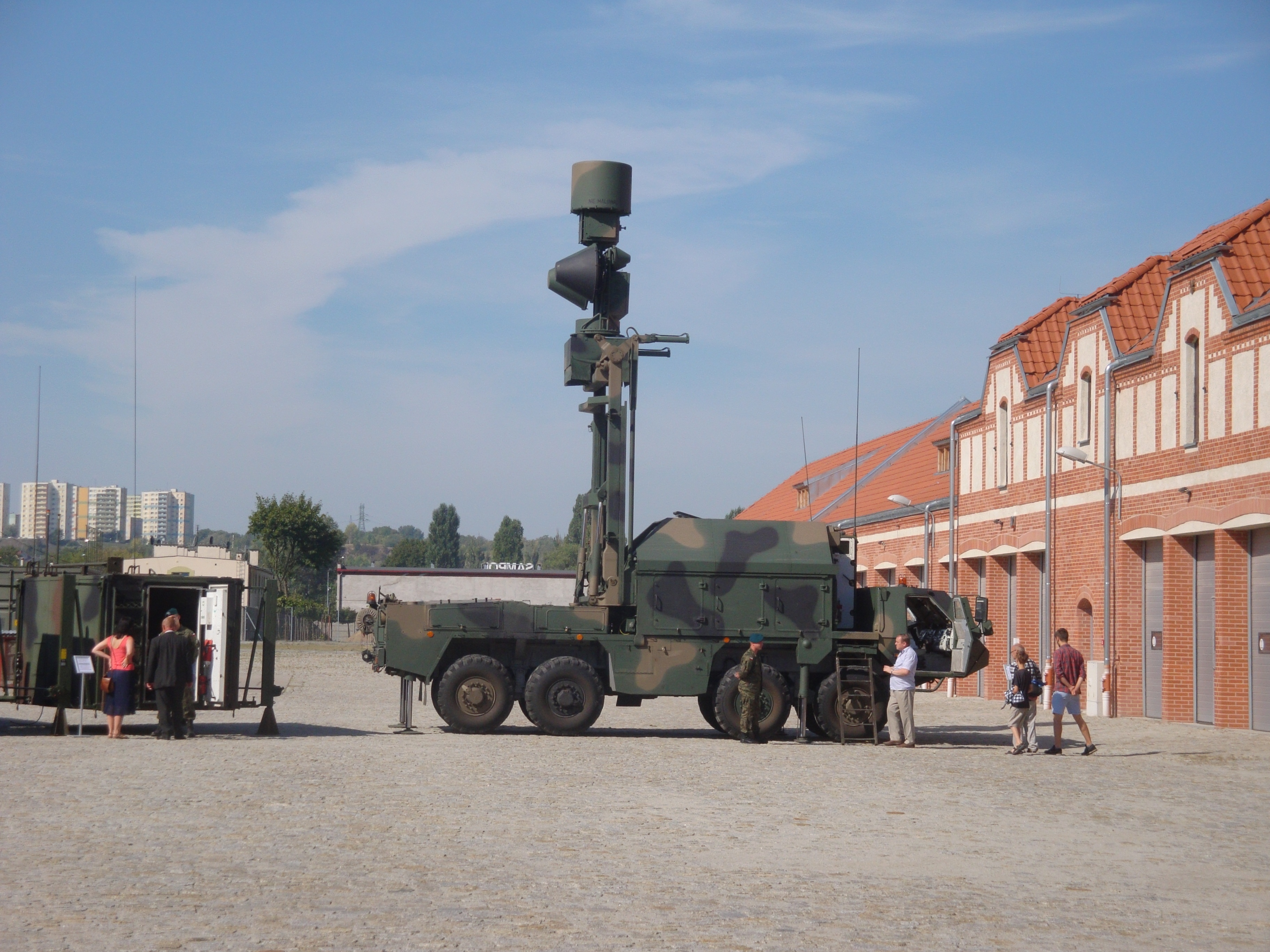
- Country of origin: Poland
- Designer: PIT-Radwar
- Type: Radiolocation station support
- Frequency: 0,5 – 18 GHz

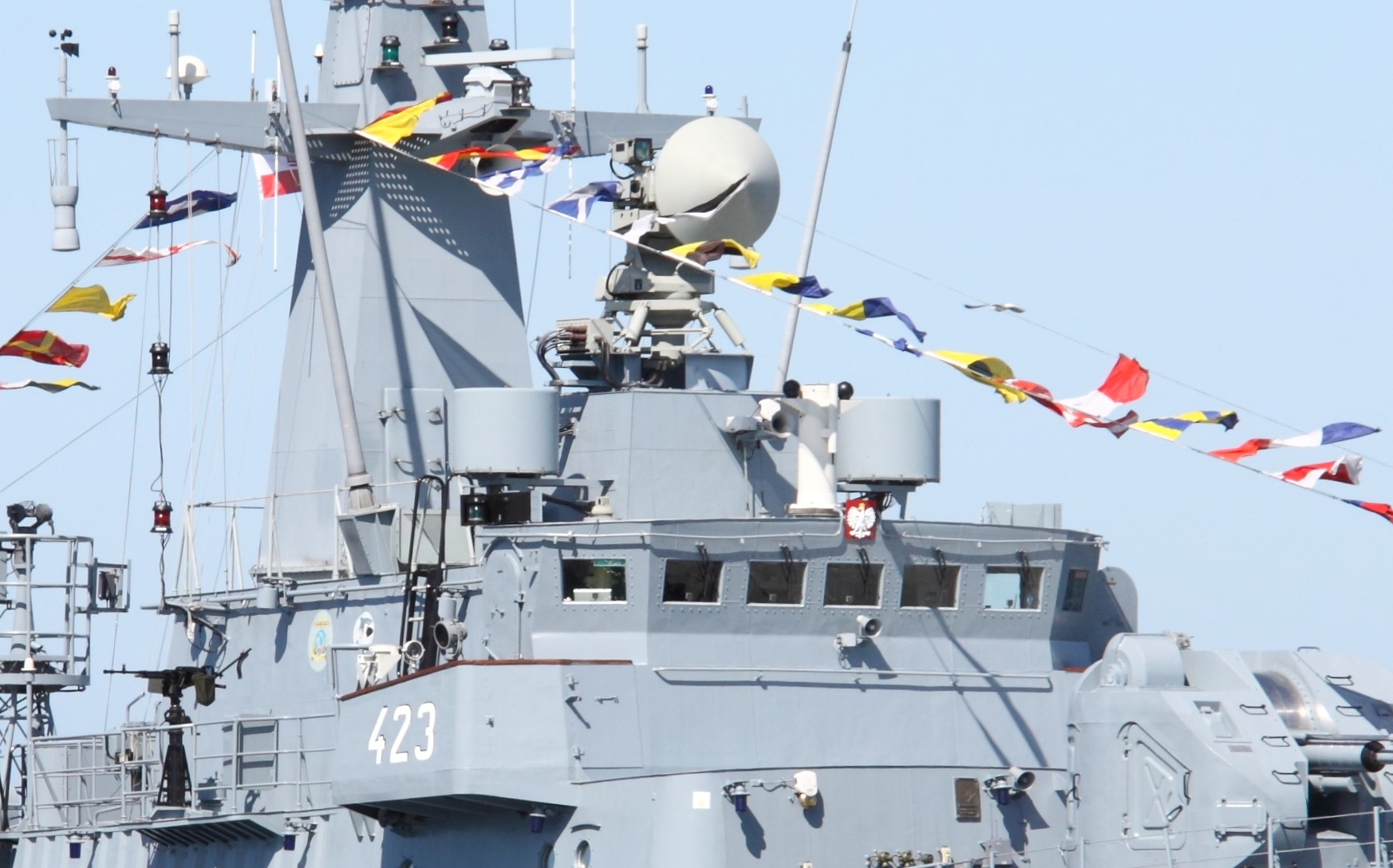
Cylindrical Breń-R system antennas placed on ORP Grom warship directly above the bridge.

Breń-2 is a ground station for reconnaissance of microwave signals, developed by the Industrial Telecommunications Institute (currently PIT-Radwar), built on an armoured vehicle based on the Tatra 815 chassis.

== Development ==
In 1993, the Industrial Telecommunications Institute, together with the Radiolocation Institute of the Military University of Technology, began developing modern electronic radio reconnaissance systems. The result was the implementation of the Breń-2 system (for Polish Land Forces) and the Breń-R / Srokosz (for the Navy) into armament. They became the basis for the development of the Gunica system for the Air Force.

== Variants ==
=== Breń-R ===
In the Navy, the system is installed on warships or on Srokosz reconnaissance containers. It is used to detect, determine the direction and identify sources of radar emissions.

== Specifications ==
- Accuracy of Azimuth measurement is up to 0.5°

== See also ==
- ZDPSR Bystra
- ZDPSR Soła
- WLR-100 Liwiec
