= MN-111 =

Anti-tank mine

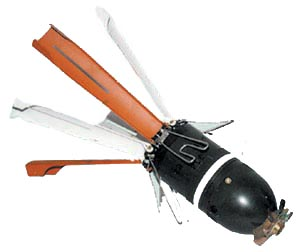
MN-111

The MN-111 is a Polish air-dropped anti-tank landmine. The mine is designed for use on soft ground. The mine is cylindrical with six spring-loaded fins attached to one end of the mine, with the cylinder drawn to a point at the opposite end which is topped with a small wind vane. The mine is stored with the fins wrapped round the outside of the mine. Once the mine is dropped from the aircraft the fins spring outward, acting as a drag parachute, slowing the rate of descent to a peak speed of about 60 meters per second. As the mine drops the wind vane spins, generating the power used to arm the mine.

The mine is designed to penetrate soft ground up to the fins, which spread out flat across the ground. The mine uses a magnetic influence fuze, which is triggered by the magnetic field of an armoured vehicle. It also has an anti-handling device which triggers the mine if it is disturbed.

The warhead is a shaped charge or Misznay-Schardin effect design that the manufacturer claims can penetrate 70 millimeters of armour at a stand-off of half a meter.

== Specifications ==
- Weight: 3.5 kg
- Diameter: 116 mm
- Height: 225 mm
- Explosive content: 0.8 kg of Hexogen
