= Kaktus (reconnaissance and jamming system) =

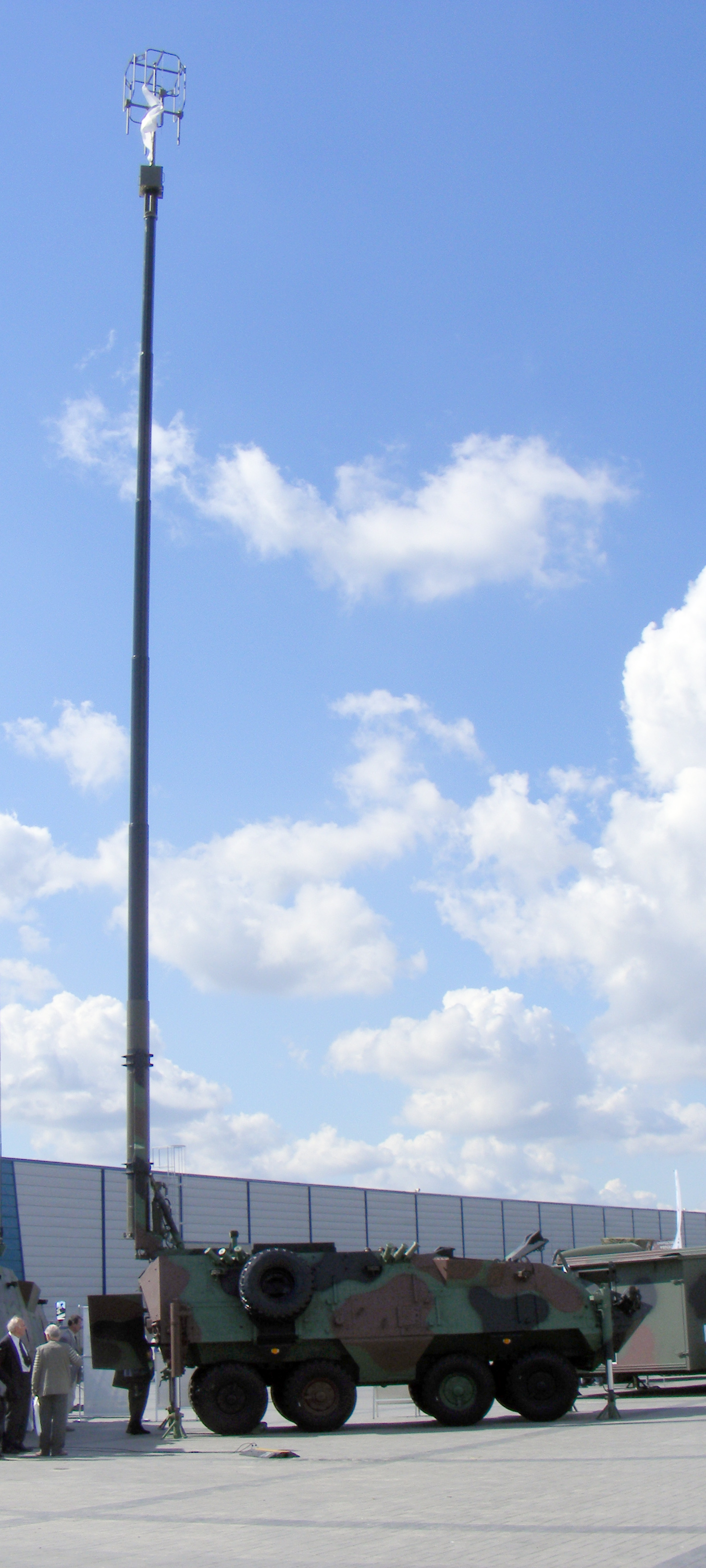
- Ryś" NR NSZR shown at MSPO 2008.
- Type: Jamming station
- Place of origin: Poland

Service history
- Used by: Polish Land Forces

Production history
- Produced: 2007–2010

Kaktus is a ground-based reconnaissance and jamming system designed to conduct electronic warfare in the field of electronic reconnaissance (ESM) and electronic countermeasures (ECM).

== Development ==
The prototype KAKTUS set in the KAKTUS-MO version (operational module) was developed in the years 2007–2010 by a consortium consisting of: the Institute of Communication of the Faculty of Electronics of the Military University of Technology, the Military Institute of Communications and the companies WITPiS, KenBIT, Thales, Rodhe&Schwartz, Bonn Elektronik, Poynting, Transbit, WAREL, Jelcz S.A. and WZM S.A. The aim of the program was to construct a modern automated system for conducting electronic warfare (EW) by WE battalions at the operational level in the HF range (1-30 MHz) and at the tactical level in the HF, VHF, UHF range (1-3000 MHz). The system meets the requirements of the modern battlefield, NATO standards meet the requirements of interoperability with automated command systems used in the Polish Army and NATO troops.

In 2017, the procedure for the development and delivery of two serial Kaktus MO reconnaissance and jamming systems for the Polish Armed Forces was initiated.

== Description ==
The automated reconnaissance and jamming system KAKTUS-MO is designed to conduct electronic warfare in the scope of ESM and ECM. Reconnaissance tasks consist in gathering information on the composition and dislocation of the enemy group, as well as the method of their actions. In terms of countermeasures, the KAKTUS system is designed to conduct offensive electronic operations consisting in emitting disruptive electromagnetic energy on the operating frequencies of the enemy's receiving devices. The system ensures cooperation with the Automated Command System of the Land Forces and interoperability with similar NATO command systems.

=== Module composition ===
The single Katkus-MO system consists of:

- Operational Level Electronic Warfare Command Vehicle
- Analysis Wagon
- four pieces of HF radio direction finder
- four pieces of HF interference stations
- six units of Radio Receiving Equipment

== Gallery ==
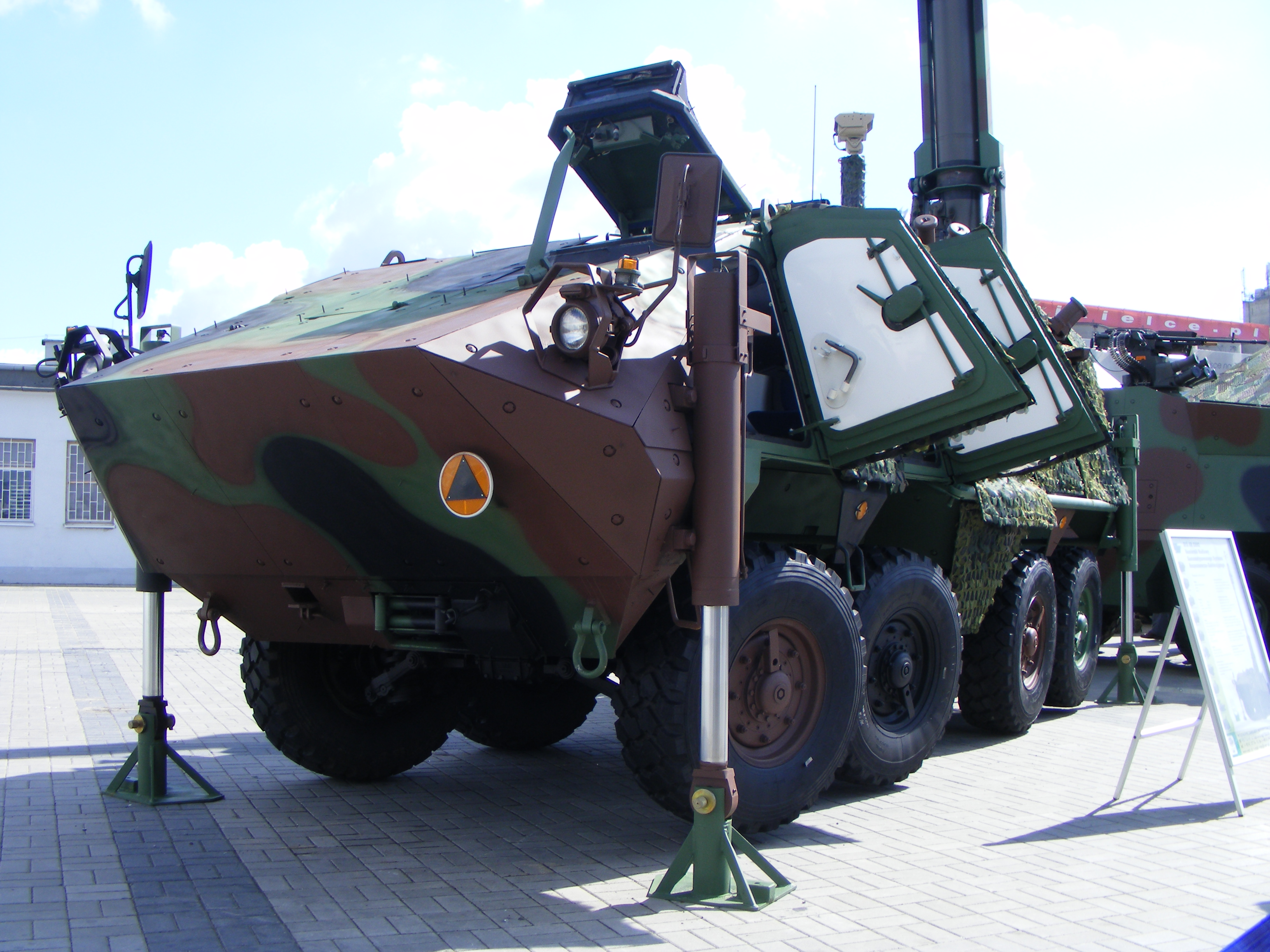
Radio Direction Finder of the Automated Reconnaissance and Jamming System Kaktus

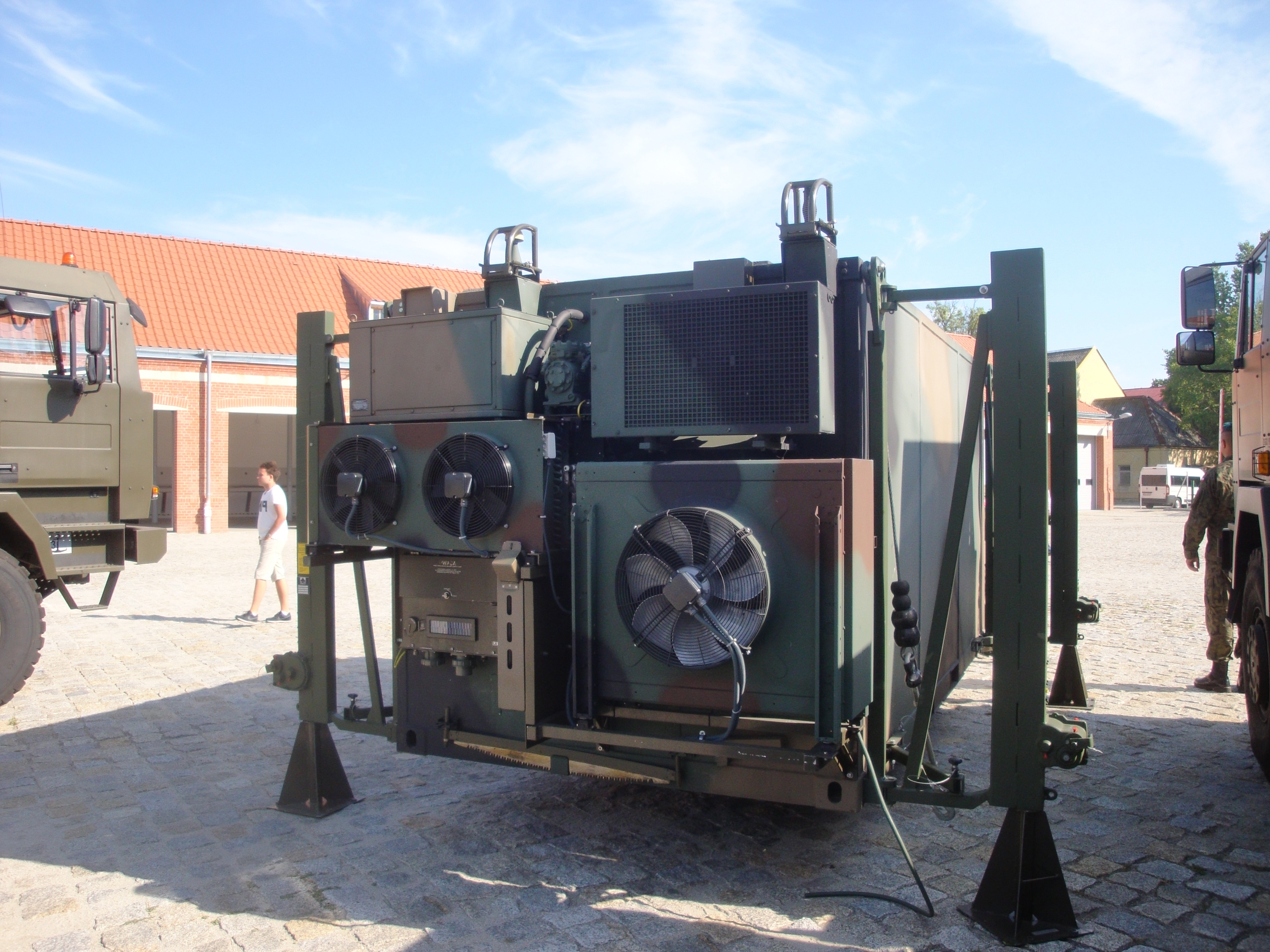
One of the containers of the KAKTUS reconnaissance and jamming system

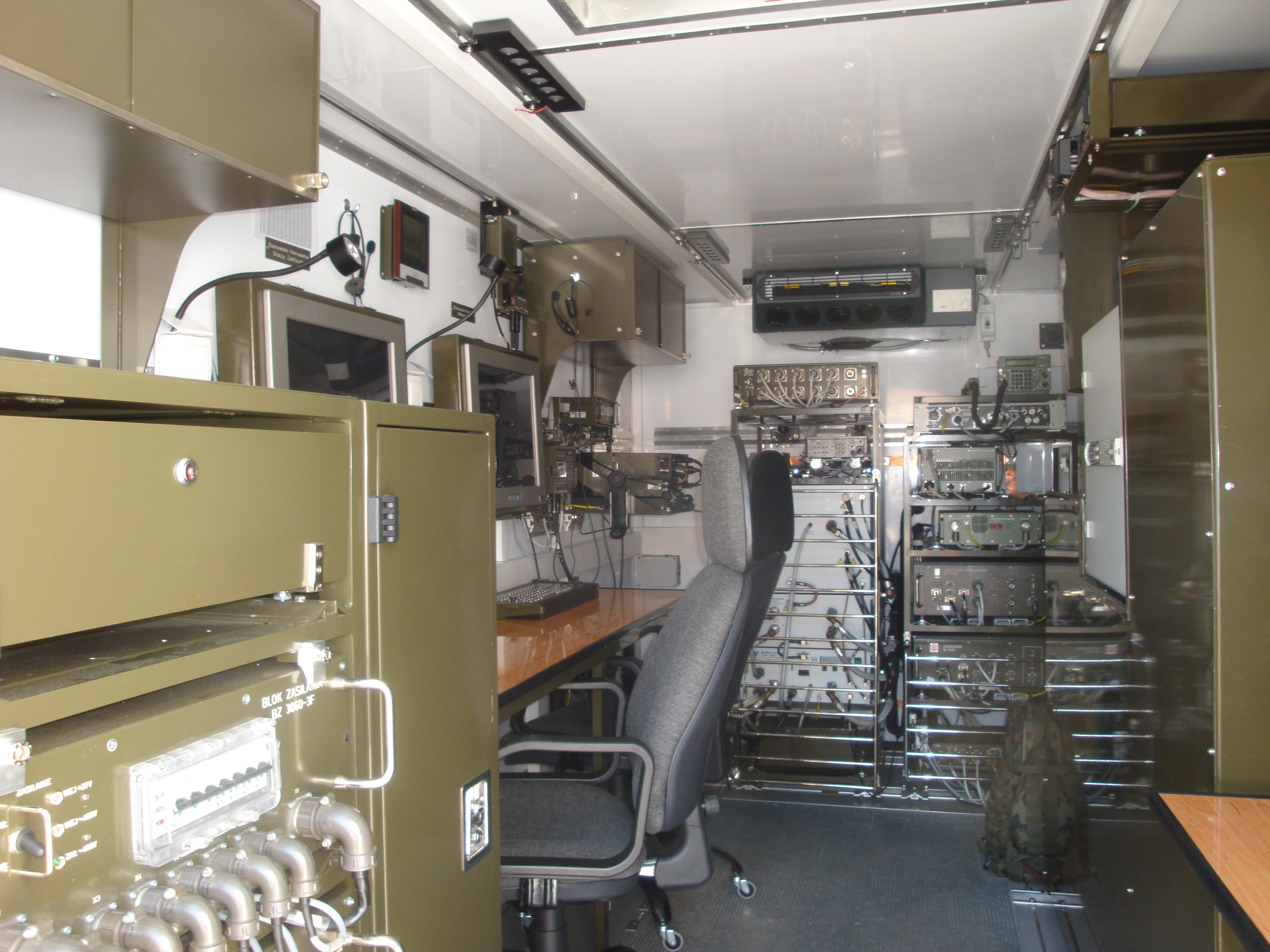
The interior of one of the containers

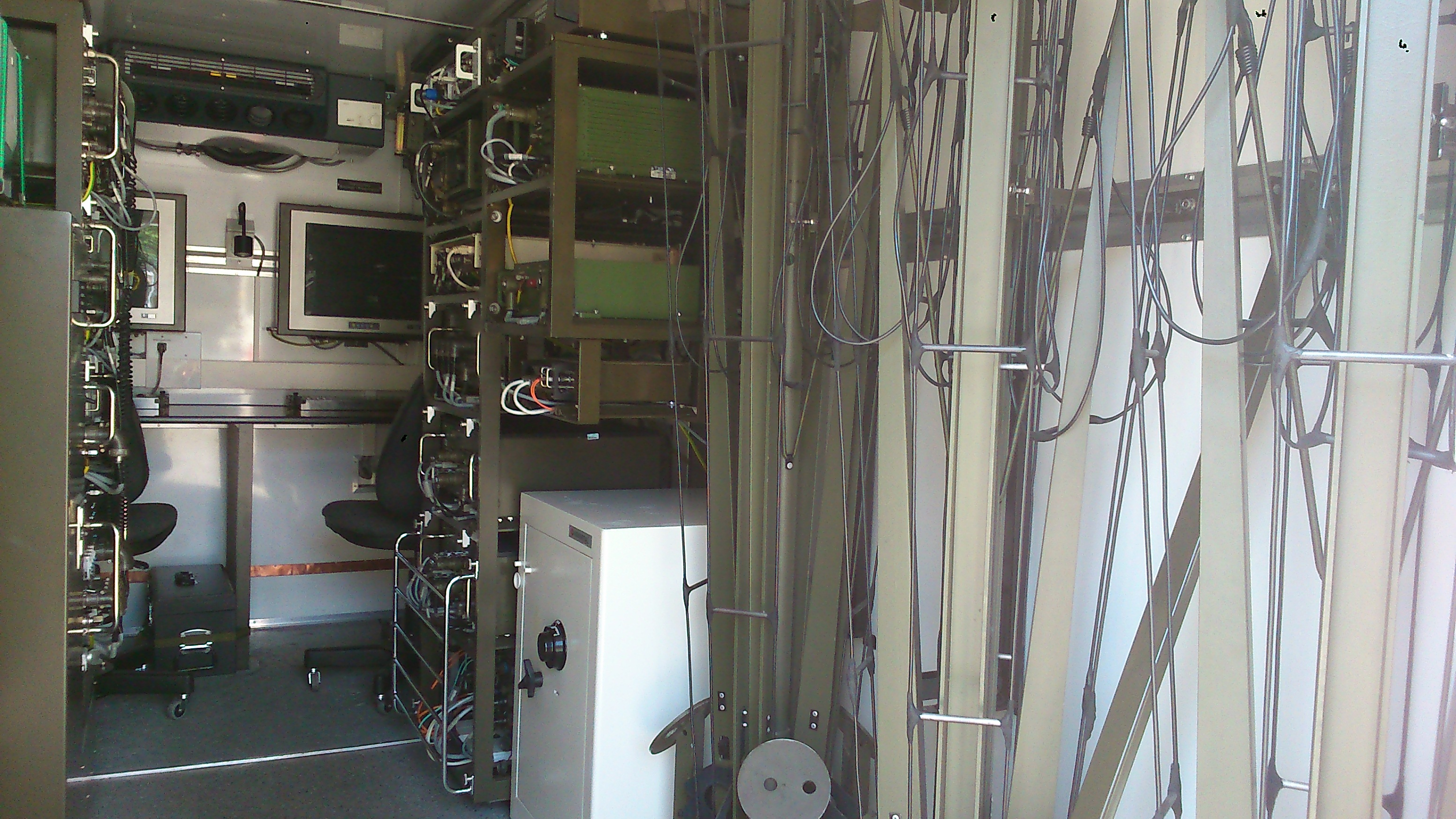
The interior of one of the containers
