= Hełm HBT-02 =

Combat helmet

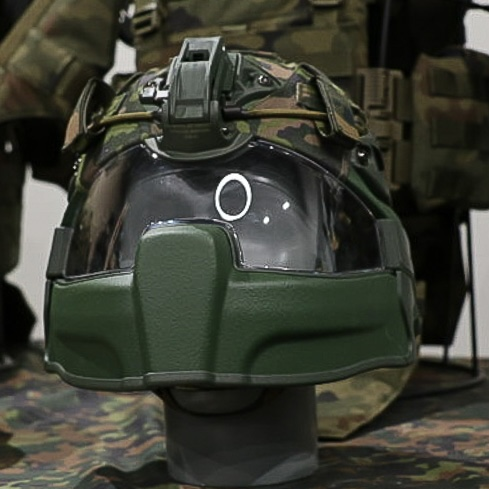
- Type: Combat helmet
- Place of origin: Poland

Production history
- Designer: Maskpol
- Manufacturer: Maskpol
- Produced: 2024 - present

The Hełm HBT-02 is a low-cut ballistic helmet developed by Maskpol primarily for Polish Armed Forces.

== History ==
In May 2024, Maskpol announced that the HBT-02 completed testing with deliveries planned from 2024.

== Development ==
The HBT-02 was developed as part of the Advanced Individual Combat System Tytan project. As indicated by manufacturer Maskpol, it is to provide high ballistic protection, and thanks to its modular design, it can also be offered with additional elements protecting the jaw and face.

The HBT-02 will be available in three sizes, with the option of adjusting to the soldier's head circumference.

On May 28, 2026, the first 300,000 HBT-02 helmets were ordered by the Polish Army as a part of funding from the Security Action for Europe (SAFE) program.

== Specifications ==
- Absorbs up to 90 percent of the energy of a high-speed impact.
- Side line covering the ears (low-cut) for increased protection compared to high-cut helmets.
- Compatibility with active hearing protection and gas masks despite being low-cut.

== Operators ==
- Poland: The prototypes of the helmet have already been tested by soldiers of the 18th Mechanized Division and it was speculated that they will enter the service in 2025.
