= Heron (armored personnel carrier) =

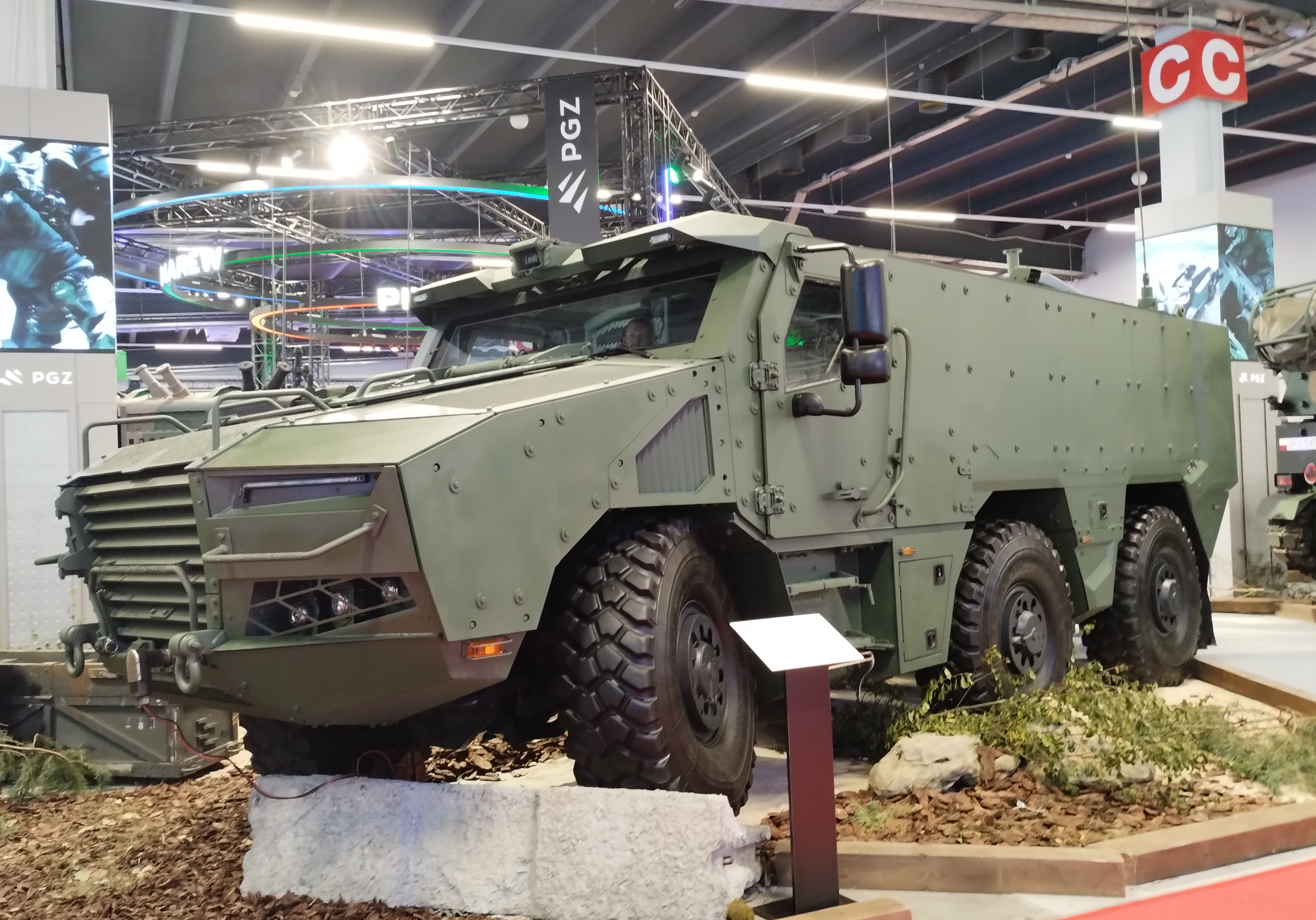
- Heron at International Defence Industry Exhibition 2024 in Kielce, Poland.
- Type: Wheeled armored personnel carrier
- Place of origin: Poland / Czech Republic

Production history
- Designer: Tatra Defence Vehicle / Huta Stalowa Wola

Specifications
- Crew: 2 + 11

Heron is a wheeled armoured personnel carrier with a 6x6 drive, in a command vehicle version equipped with HMS C3IS Jasmin data processing and internal communications equipment. The carrier is planned to be used as a command and staff vehicle in Homar-K missile launcher divisions. In May 2024, it was tested in Polish Army exercises under the codename Field Experimentation Exercise 2024, at the Land Forces Training Center in Nowa Dęba and at the training ground in Lipa.

Ultimately, it is to be partially produced by Huta Stalowa Wola S.A. – Autosan Branch in Sanok.

== Construction details ==
Heron is the result of cooperation between Huta Stalowa Wola and the Czech company Tatra Defence Vehicle (TDV). The basis for the transporter from HSW is the Czech design of the TADEAS 6×6 vehicle (TAtra DEfence Armoured Solution), built on the chassis of the Tatra 815-7 truck. The superstructure was designed by TDV in cooperation with HSW based on the requirements of the Polish Army, in a three-axle configuration with two steering axles: the first and the last. The drive system was unified with the one currently used in the Waran 4x4. The use of two steering axles makes it easy to maneuver in all conditions, and centrally inflated wheels and run-flat inserts allow you to drive even after a tire is damaged.

== Technical information ==
It carries a crew of 2 and 11 landing troops. It accelerates on paved roads to about 110 - 120 km/h. The vehicle's empty weight is about 22 tons (depending on equipment and armor). The permissible gross weight is 30 tons, and the maximum payload is 10 tons. The driving range is about 700 km. It overcomes a slope of 70%, the angle of approach exceeds 38%, and the angle of departure 50%. It overcomes water obstacles 1.2 meters deep, vertical obstacles 0.4 meters high and ditches 1.6 meters wide. The armour provides ballistic protection level 3a/4a according to the STANAG 4569 standard, and mine protection level 4a/4b (explosion under the vehicle of 10 kg of TNT)

== Propulsion ==
The drive is provided by an 8-cylinder Tatra T3-928-RE diesel engine, eighth generation with power from 300 to 370 kW, or optionally Caterpillar C9.3B engines with power of 395 or 447 kW and Cummins ISL with power of 300 kW. The engines are coupled with an automatic gearbox with six gears. A similar choice also applies to the transmission. The options include Allison 4500SP automatic, ZF Ecolife II automatic, or Traxxon automated.

== Armament ==
The automated combat management system HMS C3IS Jasmine, for commanding battalions, regiments, brigades and divisions. It provides not only orders, but also intelligence and logistics data, including: the positions of their subordinate units, the direction of their movement, and ammunition supplies.

The transporter can be equipped with an open-type machine gun station or a remote-controlled weapon module. The situational awareness of the battlefield of the crew and landing troops is increased by a 360-degree observation system with a set of cameras on the vehicle's hull.
