= MN-121 mine =

Anti-tank mine

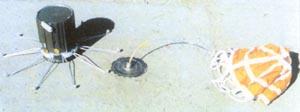
MN-121 mine

The MN-121 is a Polish scatterable anti-tank mine, externally similar to the German AT-2 mine. The mine is cylindrical with ten wire legs which fold outward to keep the mine upright. The mine uses a magnetic influence fuze, which triggers the mine when a vehicle passes over it. The mine also has an anti-handling device which triggers the mine if it is moved. The mine's warhead is a shaped charge design containing approximately 700 grams of RDX. The manufacturer claims that it is capable of penetrating 60 millimeters of armour at an offset of half a meter.

The mine can be deployed either from aircraft, a specialised mine laying system or 122 mm artillery rockets. When required the mine is ejected from a storage canister, and shortly afterwards a small parachute is opened, which both retards the descent and keeps the mine correctly oriented as it descends. Once the mine lands on the ground the top of the mine is ejected, along with the parachute and the spring-loaded legs bring the mine upright.

The mine can be manually programmed to self-destruct after a period of 3, 6, 12, 24 or 96 hours.

== Specifications ==
- Height: 187 mm
- Diameter: 116 mm
- Weight: 2.8 kg
- Explosive content: 0.7 kg of RDX
