= Star 1142 =

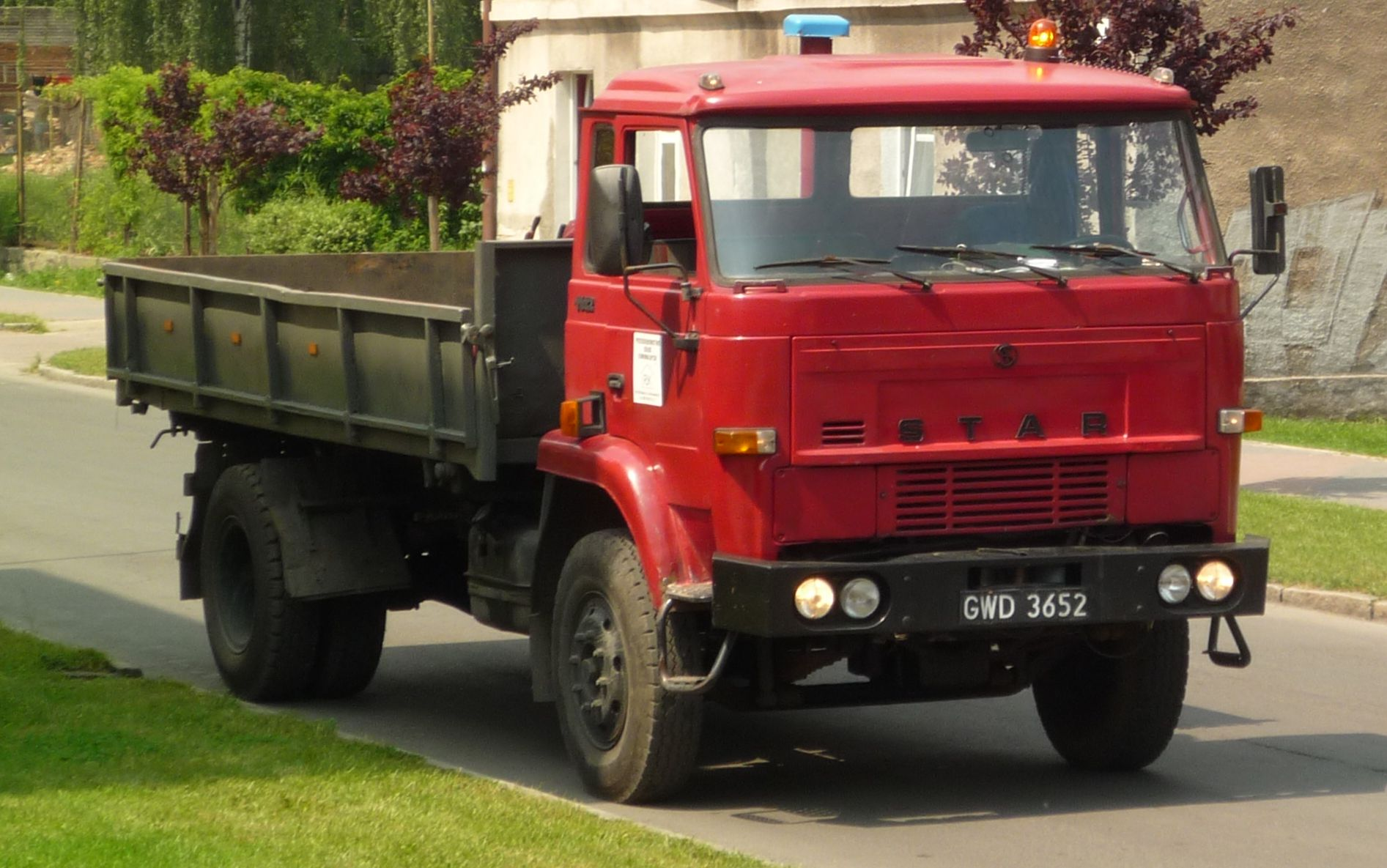

Overview
- Manufacturer: FSC Star
- Production: 1986-2000
- Assembly: Poland

Body and chassis
- Class: Truck
- Body style: 2-door standard cab

Powertrain
- Engine: 6,8L S-359E inline 6
- Transmission: 5-speed manual

Dimensions
- Length: 7280 mm
- Width: 2380 mm
- Height: 3300 mm
- Curb weight: 5150 kg

Chronology
- Predecessor: Star 200

The Star 1142 is a Polish truck produced in 1986-2000 by FSC Star in Starachowice, Poland. It is the successor to the Star 200.

== History ==
The basic model of the road truck in the FSC Star offer, which had been the Star 200 since 1975, was already significantly behind the competition in the early eighties. The economic crisis did not allow for replacing the 200 model with a completely new vehicle, so it was decided to go down the path of deep modernization or replacement of key components of the Star 200, which resulted in a practically new vehicle only slightly similar to its predecessor in appearance.

The newly designed manually tilting wagon (the first in the history of mass-produced Star trucks) driver's cabin, despite its external similarity to its predecessor (caused by the need to produce on the existing lines built for the Star 200), was significantly improved technologically: it had fewer, but larger, stampings, fewer weld points (potential corrosion centers) and better anti-corrosion protection. At the same time, it was a modular design, which made it possible to produce a non-tilting version of this cabin (intended for the Star 200) on the same lines. A whole range of changes were introduced (vs Star 200): uniform pressed sheet metal covers ("dummies") of the engine and radiator (instead of sheet metal/mesh ones) improving aesthetics and soundproofing (a uniform black "lattice" hinged cover was also tested in prototypes, but it was not introduced into production), a deeper embossed cabin roof, new front wheel covers with mudguards, shortened cabin doors with new seals and lower external handles (from the Polski Fiat 126) and new panoramic external mirrors, a new modular clock assembly, new seats and plastic upholstery of the cabin interior and non-slip and soundproofing floor and engine linings. Modern wiring and electrical system were used. The efficiency of the heating and ventilation system was improved and the archaic air intakes above the windscreen were removed. Thanks to the use of three instead of two wiper arms, the cleaned area of the windscreen was significantly enlarged. Thanks to the use of a closed cooling system with a tank on the rear frame of the cabin mounting, the flap under the windscreen, characteristic of previous models, protecting the radiator fluid filler cap, has been removed.

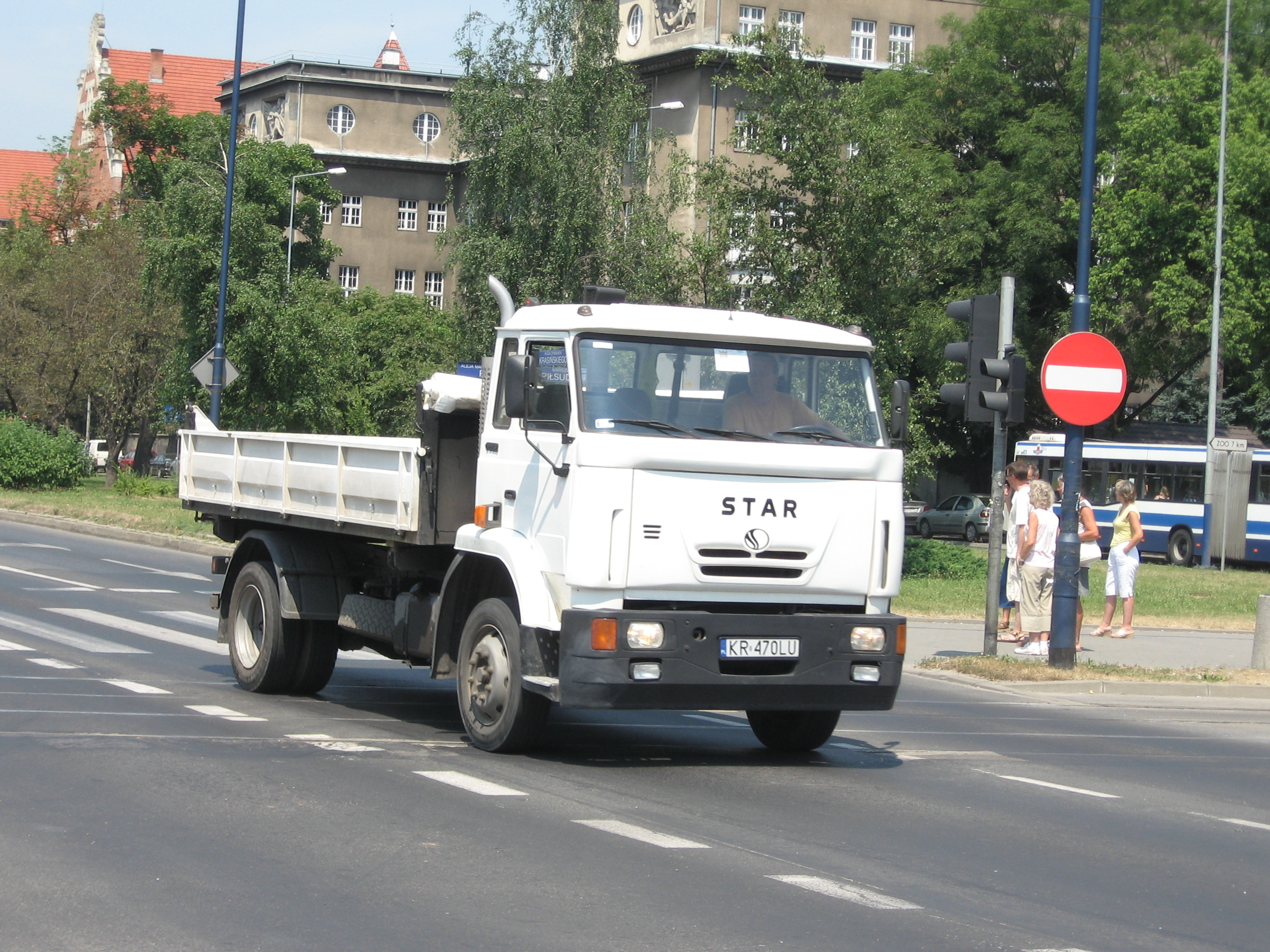
Star 1142 with cabin after modernization

The pneumatic system has three separate compressed air tanks instead of one multi-chamber tank in the Star 200 model. The fuel tank mounting has been redesigned, reducing its weight and eliminating the problem of tank corrosion that often appeared in the old solution.

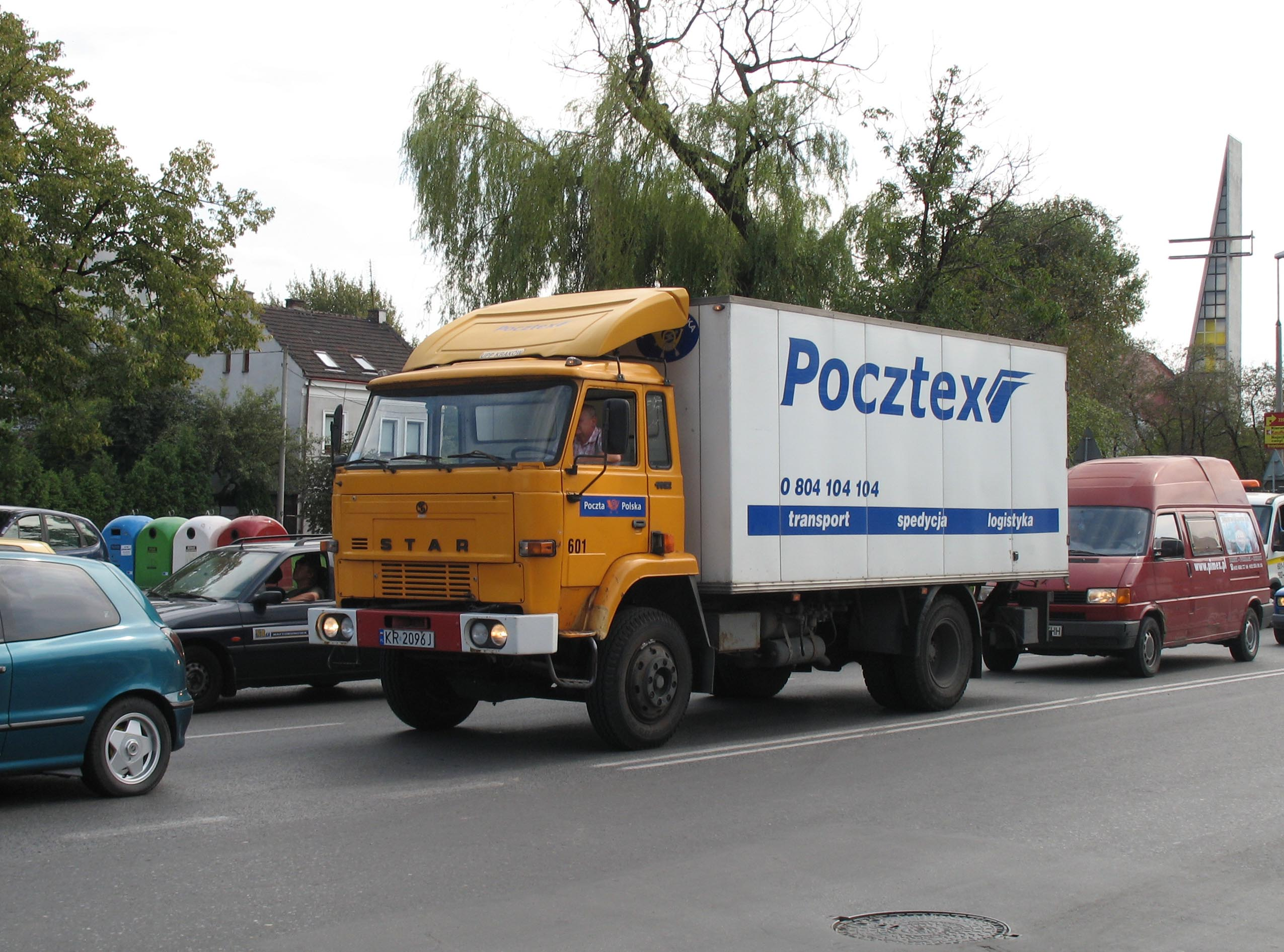
Star 1142 used by Polish Post

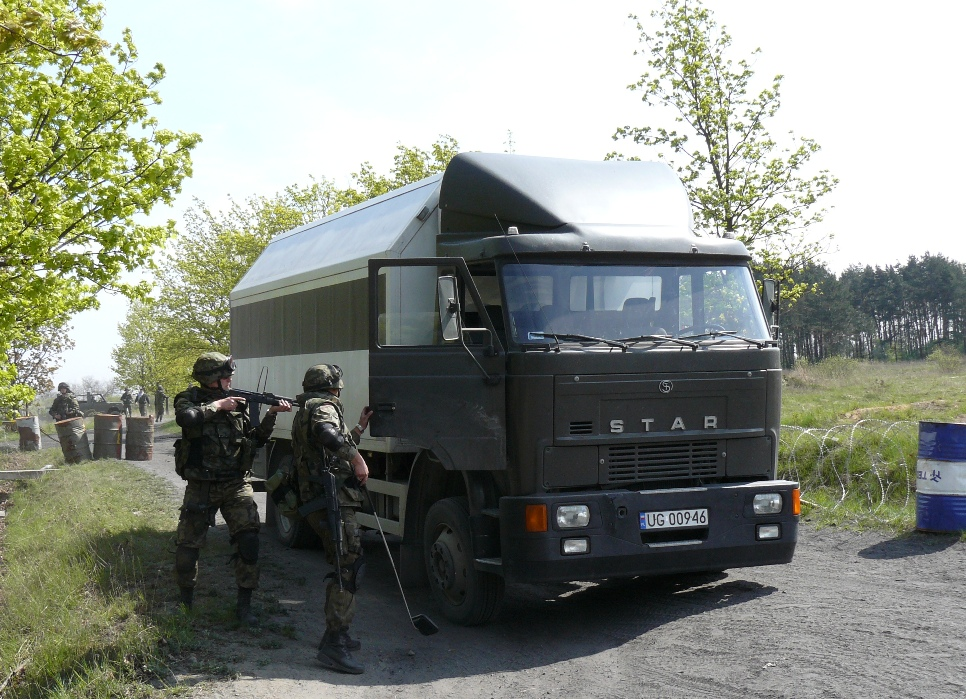
Star 1142 used by Polish Armed Forces

The cargo box was steel with a wooden floor and new, lighter divided side walls with removable pillars, it was possible to carry loads weighing up to 6500 kg. 6-cylinder in-line modernized Star S359M engine, naturally aspirated diesel with direct injection. The Star car engine had a slightly higher torque of 467 Nm (Star 200- 440 Nm). The engine block was cast iron, the forged crankshaft mounted in 7 bearings, aluminum pistons with an internal toroidal swirl combustion chamber and the engine head consisted of three two-cylinder segments made of special cast iron. In the version for Star 1142, the air compressor mount was lowered, a split exhaust manifold was introduced, the V-belt tensioning system was changed and the emergency alternator drive was redesigned (the change consisted of introducing a slightly different alternator bracket casting). The air filter was placed on a frame centrally behind the cabin with an intake "chimney" led out above the cabin roof. The exhaust system was also changed, thanks to which the vehicle's noise level was reduced. The gearbox manufactured by FPS Tczew under the license of the German company ZF, synchronized type S5-45, 5 forward gears, plus reverse gear, in prototypes a 10-speed version of this gearbox equipped with a multiplier was also tested, but its production was not launched. Improved (emergency in the 200 model) bearings The deeply modernized single-stage drive axle manufactured by FSC Star had a load capacity increased by 500 kg, and at the same time its weight was reduced by slimming down the castings. A new front axle with increased load capacity and durability was used. The vehicle used a new hydraulic drum brake control system on both axles, dual-circuit, controlled by a pneumatic system. New brake pumps with control were placed outside the frame side member on the left side in front of the rear axle. Suspension of both axles on longitudinal semi-elliptical leaf springs (domestic industry was initially unable to supply parabolic springs which are lighter and have better operating characteristics), modified additional rubber shock absorbers were introduced on the rear axle, telescopic shock absorbers FA Krosno were used on the front axle, and hydraulic shock absorbers and a roll stabilizer, previously not used in Star road trucks, were used on the rear axle, improving the comfort of the driver and cargo. A new steel front bumper was used with a completely different (despite the same external appearance as in the Star 200) design of the tow bar attachment, which was placed on the front cross member of the chassis frame and the bumper only covered it (in the 200 model the attachment was part of the bumper). New, more convenient spare wheel mounts were developed on the right frame side member behind the fuel tank in the 200 under the rear part of the frame. Many of the above solutions were also introduced in the later versions of the Star 200 model produced in parallel, which meant that these models differed from the outside only in the height of the cabin suspension.

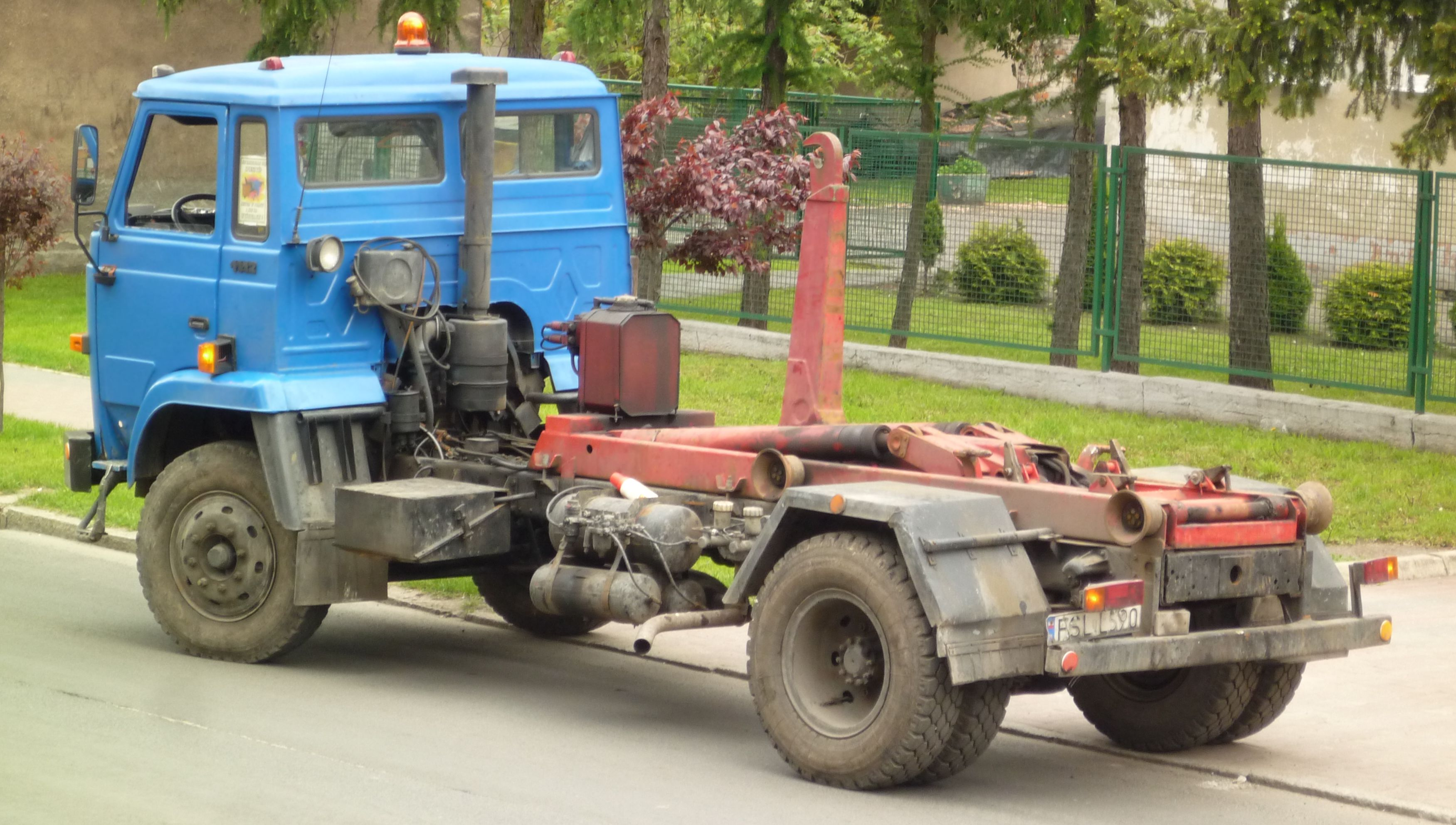
Star 1142 garbage truck

A 4x4 version of this model, the Star 1144, was also developed, but it remained a prototype. A 6x6 version, the Star 1366, was also developed (based on the interest of the Hungarian Army) with a turbocharged engine and improved load capacity and off-road parameters. Its production was not launched. The Star 1142 road cars were also ordered in small quantities by the Polish Armed Forces, e.g. 41 units in 1999.

In 2000, production of the Stara 1142 ended, with less than 15,400 units sold.

== See also ==
- Star 28/29
- Star 244
- Star 744
