= Star 744 =

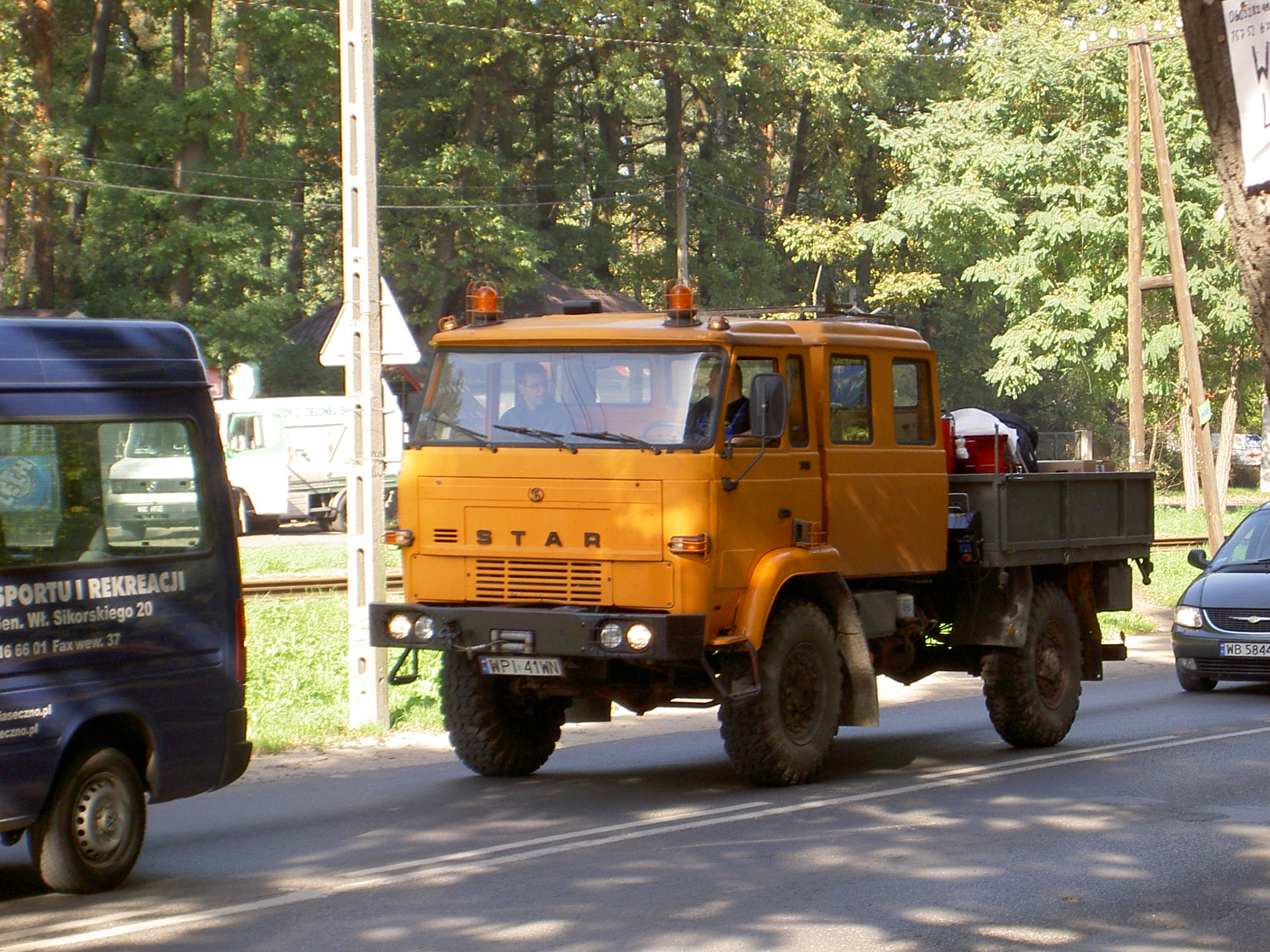

Overview
- Type: 4x4 truck
- Manufacturer: FSC Star
- Model years: 1992-2000
- Assembly: Poland

Powertrain
- Engine: 6,8L T359E V6
- Transmission: 5-speed manual

Dimensions
- Length: 6690 mm
- Width: 2350 mm
- Height: 2790 mm
- Curb weight: 5000 kg

Chronology
- Predecessor: Star 244
- Successor: Star 944

The Star 744 is a Polish 4x4 truck produced in 1992-2000 by FSC Star in Starachowice, Poland.

== History ==
The successor to the Star 244 truck is also intended to partially replace the Star 266 for the needs of the Polish Armed Forces and energy companies.

The Star 744 was produced in three versions, differing in cabins. The basic version had a cabin for two people, the version for energy companies had an additional cabin for 6 people, and the version for the "Geofizyka" company had a large cabin and luggage area. Special equipment was also placed on the chassis of the Star 744 - it was sometimes equipped with an electrically powered winch with a pulling force of 45 kN. The T359E engine had 109 hp at 2400 rpm from a capacity of 4.56 L and a maximum torque of 400 Nm at 1400 rpm. The vehicle's load capacity is up to 2000 kg of cargo and 6 people (600 kg).

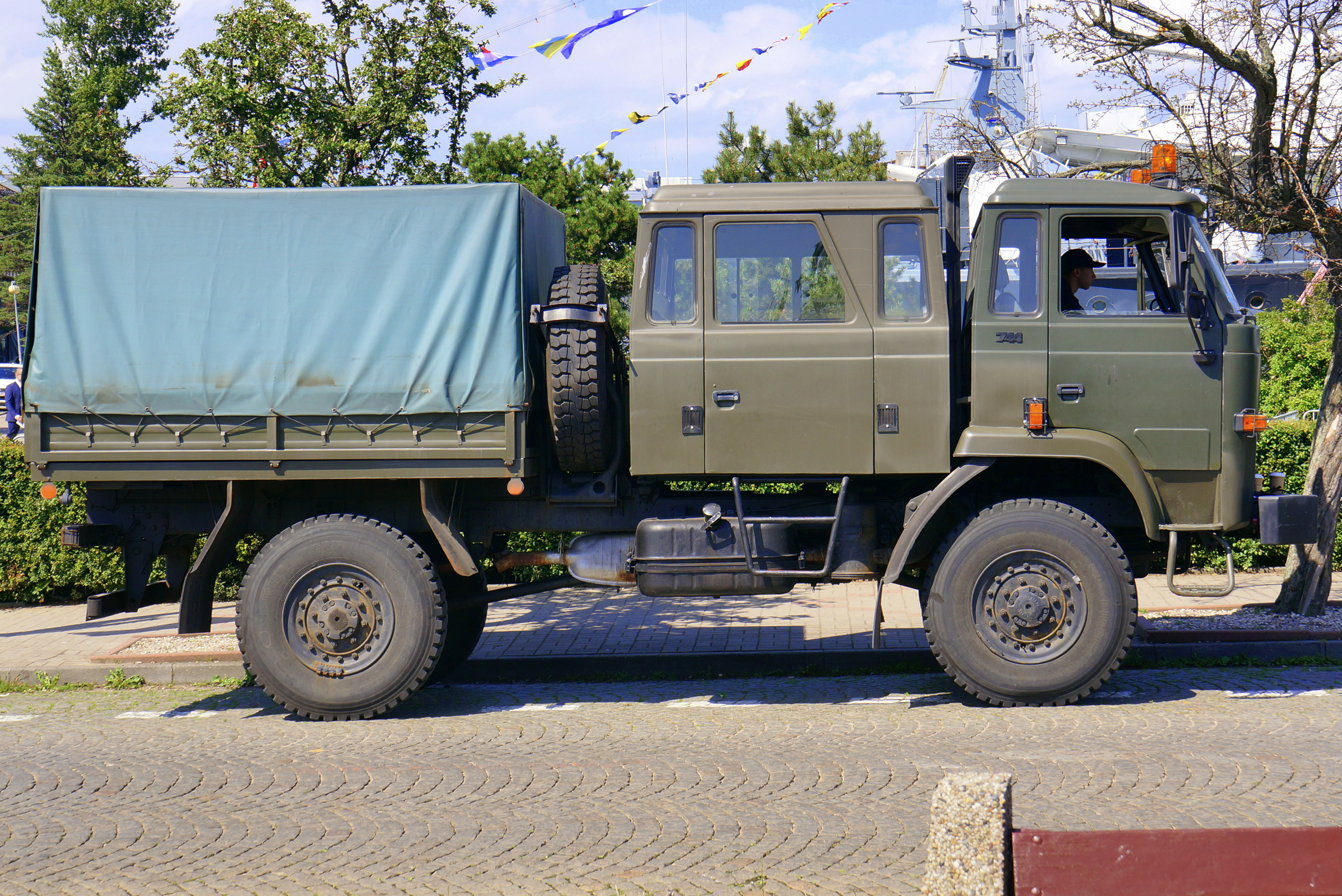
Polish military Star 744

32 trucks were delivered to the Polish Army in 1999 and 50 in 2000.

There are also known examples of the use of the Star 744 in Maritime Search And Rescue Service.
