= FSC Star =

Polish former truck manufacturer

F.S.C. STAR
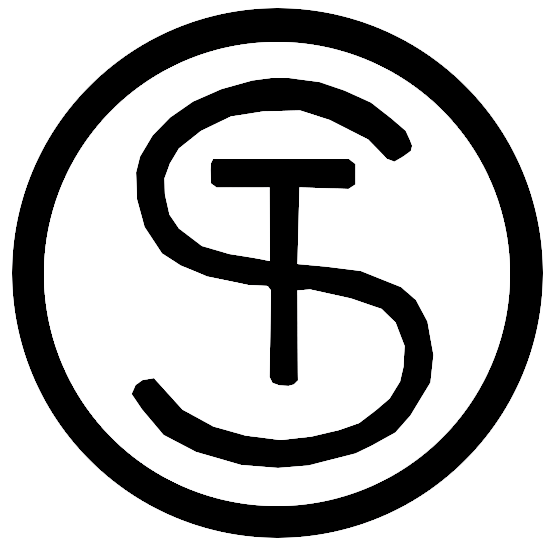
- Type: Public company
- Industry: Manufacturing
- Founded: 1948
- Headquarters: Starachowice, Poland
- Products: Trucks
- Services: industrial services
- Parent: MAN AG

Fabryka Samochodów Ciężarowych "Star" (FSC Star), also known simply as Star, was a Polish truck manufacturer. The name comes from the City of Starachowice, where the factory is located. Their first vehicle was the Star 20 in 1948. The most popular product was the Star 266. The 266 model offered very good quality and powerful engines for a low price. It was sold in various countries for many years (not only in the Eastern Bloc; for example it was used by the Yemen Army). For many years, FSC Star was a state-owned company. Star is now owned by MAN AG who retired the brand in January 2009.

== History ==
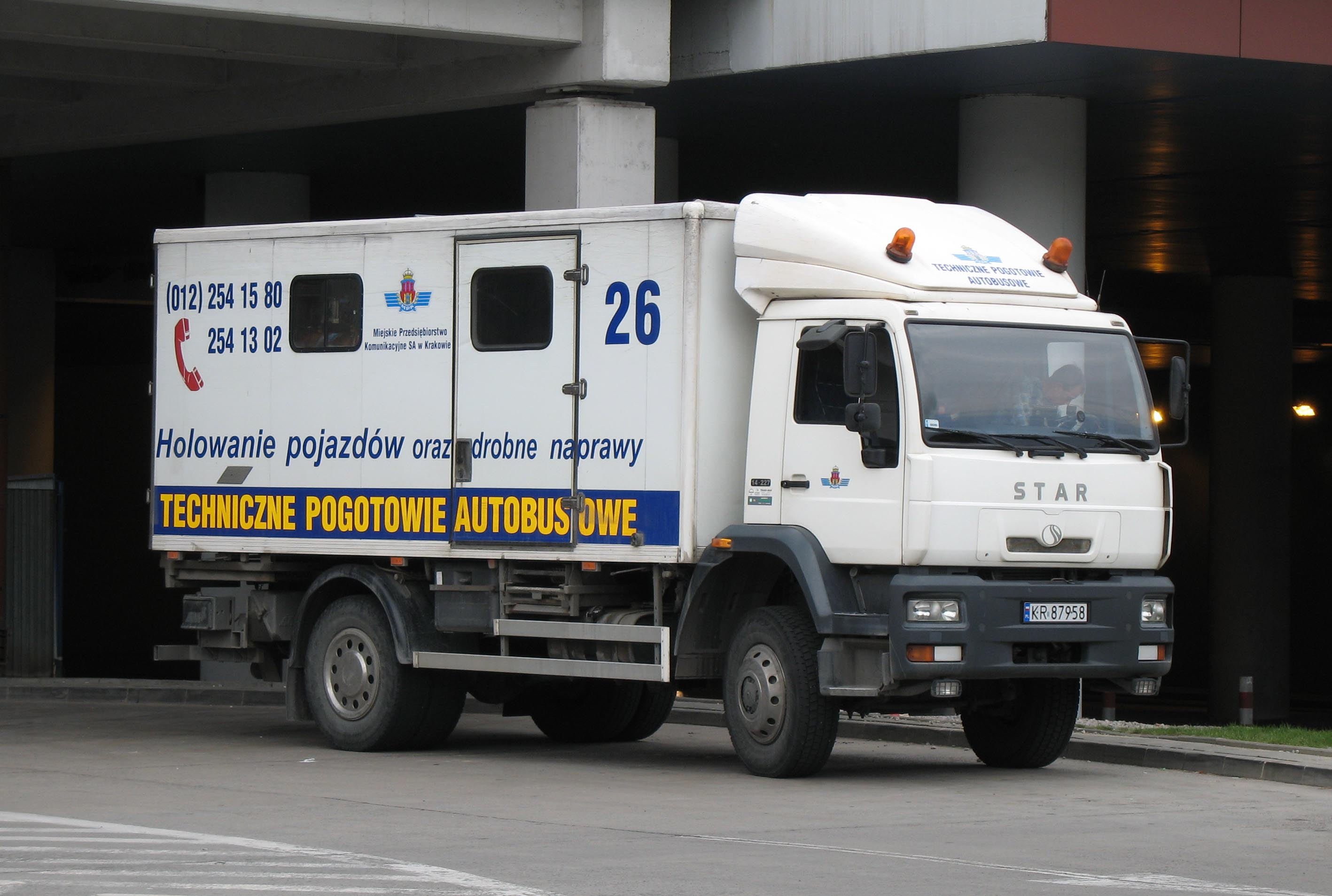
Star S2000

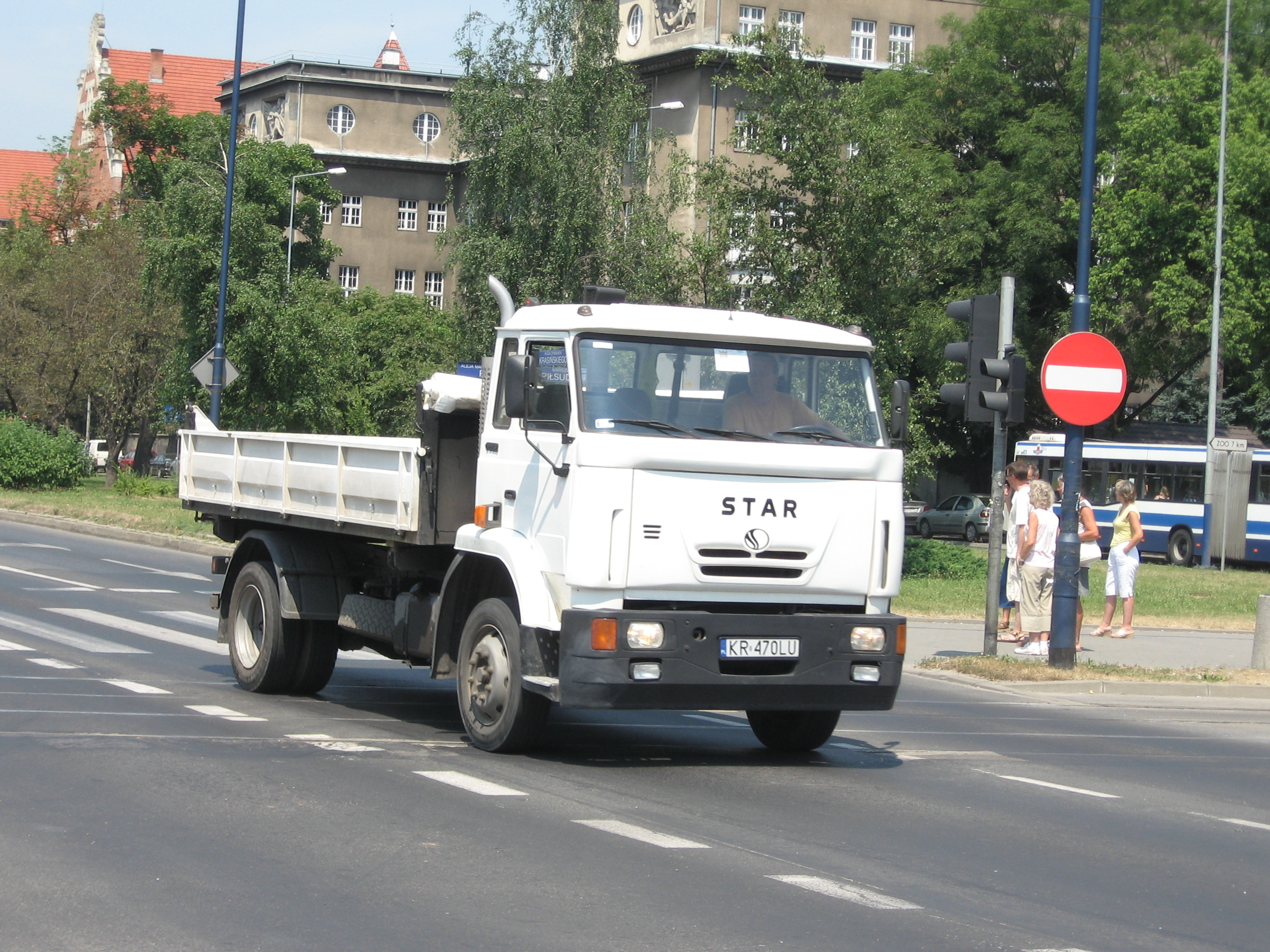
Star 1142

The state-owned company Fabryka Samochodów Ciężarowych im. Feliksa Dzierżyńskiego was established in 1948 in place of a Lilpop, Rau i Loewenstein supplier, which had been there since 1920.

In 1991, the company was transformed into Zakład Starachowicki STAR SA. In the mid-90s control of the company was taken over by Sobiesław Zasada Centrum S.A. It tried without success to create a Polish company specializing in the production of utility vehicles. Later the company was split into two: Star Trucks Sp. z o.o. and Inwest Star S.A.

At the end of 1999, Star Trucks Sp. z o.o. was taken over by the German group MAN AG. The company continued for a few years production of trucks. These were initially trucks of its own design, then models with a large share of the group MAN components, such as drivers' cabins and engines.

On 1 August 2003, MAN Star Trucks Sp. z o.o. merged with MAN Bus Poland Sp. z o.o. into MAN Star Trucks & Busses Sp. z o.o. with headquarters in Sady near Poznan. In the same year the factory in Starachowice started making frames and chassis components for the bus plants in Sady and Salzgitter. Sady is the main production site for the Lion's City bus range.

Truck production numbers continued to fall, reaching in the final period a few hundred units per year. In 2004, manufacturing of trucks was moved to a MAN factory in Steyr, Austria (former Steyr-Daimler-Puch AG). Starachowice continued to make small numbers of trucks for the army and various services (e.g., foresters).

In 2006, manufacturing of trucks ceased completely. The plant in Starachowice currently produces frames of buses and bus and truck components for group MAN.

The brand "Star" was used for selling on the Polish market Steyr trucks produced in Austria.

On 9 January 2009, the company MAN Star Trucks & Buses dropped "Star" from the name and is now known as MAN Bus Sp. z o.o.

== Star Products ==
FSC "Star" produced the following truck models:

- Star N50 (prototype)
- Star N51 (prototype)
- Star N52 - (1952–1957)
- Star 20 - (1948–1957)
- Star 21 - (1957–1960)
- Star 25 - (1960–1971)
- Star 27 - (1962–1971)
- Star 28 - (1968–1989)
- Star 29 - (1968–1983)
- Star 66 - (1958–1965)
- Star 200 - (1975–1994)
- Star 244 - (1975–2000)
- Star 266 - (1973–2000)
- Star 266M - (2001–2006)
- Star 660 - (1965–1983)
- Star 742 - (1990–2000)
- Star 744 - (1992–2000)
- Star 944 - (2000–2007)
- Star 1144 (prototype)
- Star 1266 (prototype)
- Star 1344 (prototype)
- Star 1366 (prototype)
- Star 1142 - (1986–2000)
- Star 1466 - (2001–2006)
- Star 8.125 - (1998–2000)
- Star 12.155 - (1998–2000)
- Star Series S2000 - (2000–2004)

The S2000 family comprised the following models: 8117, 10157, 12157, 12227, 13227, 14227, 15227 series was identical with the family car MAN L2000. In the years 2004 - in 2007 Star S2000 cars were produced in Austria.

Produced a family of motors S42 and components such as axles, also for external companies, such as Autosan.

== Gallery ==
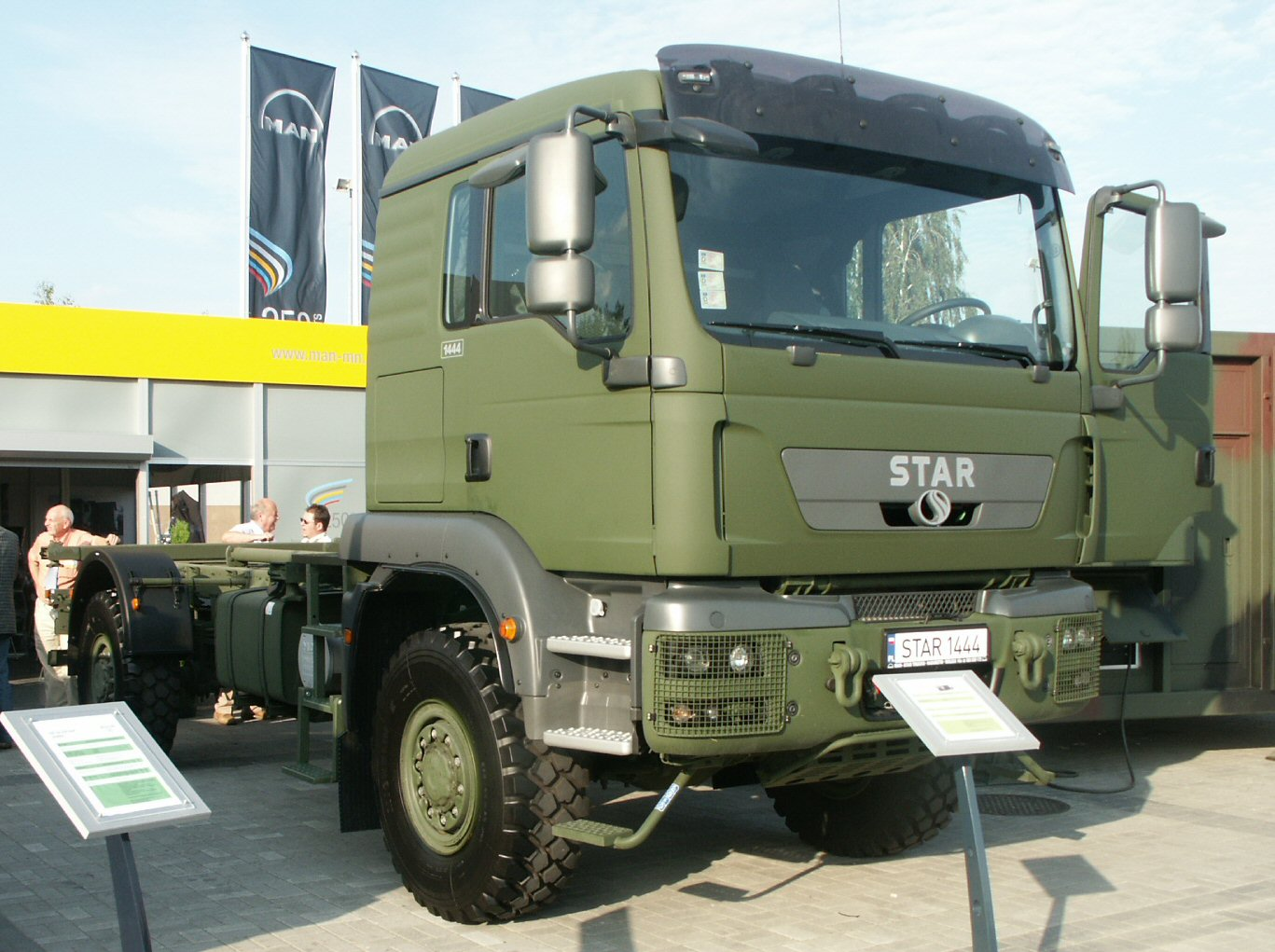
Star 1444

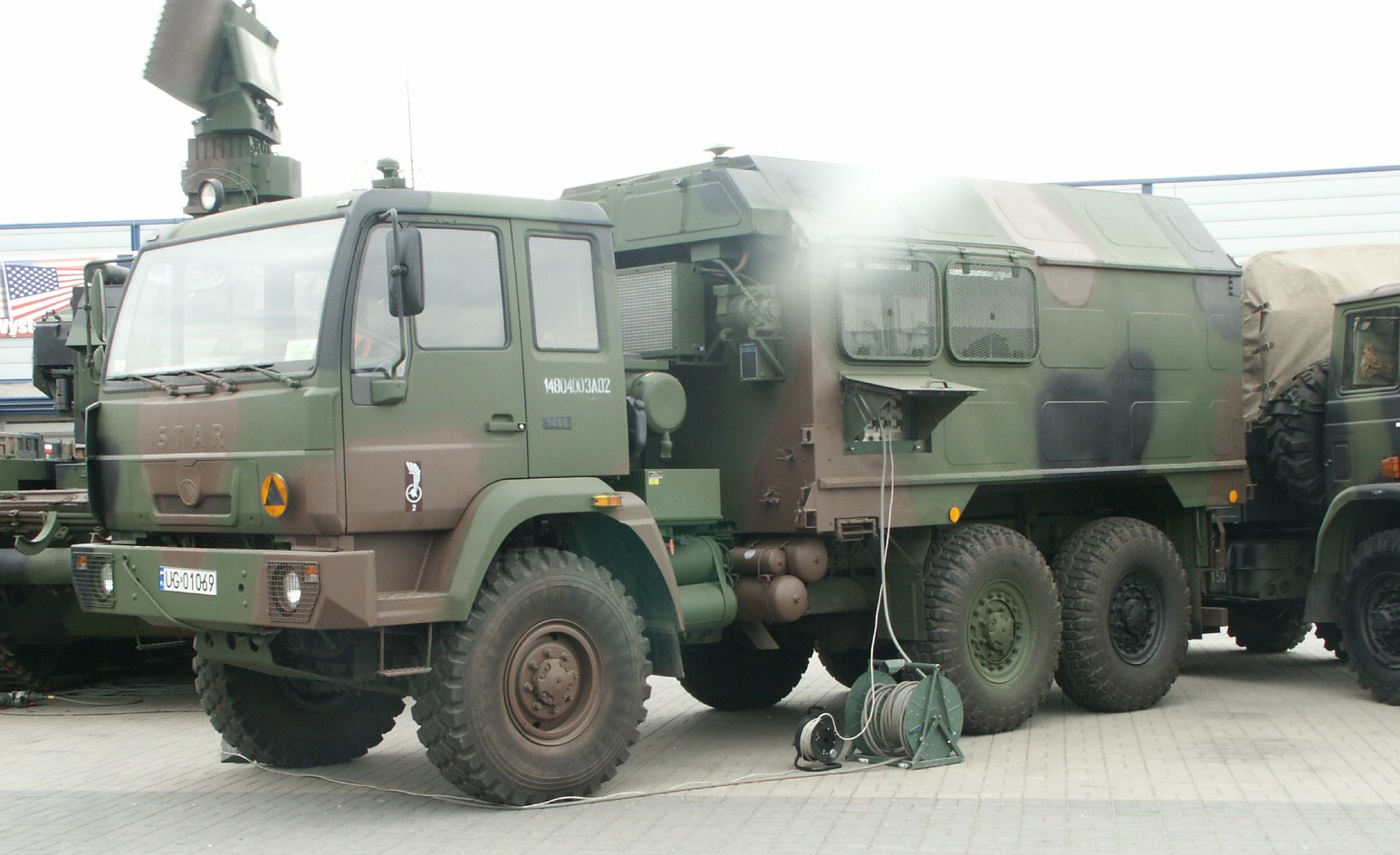
Star 1166

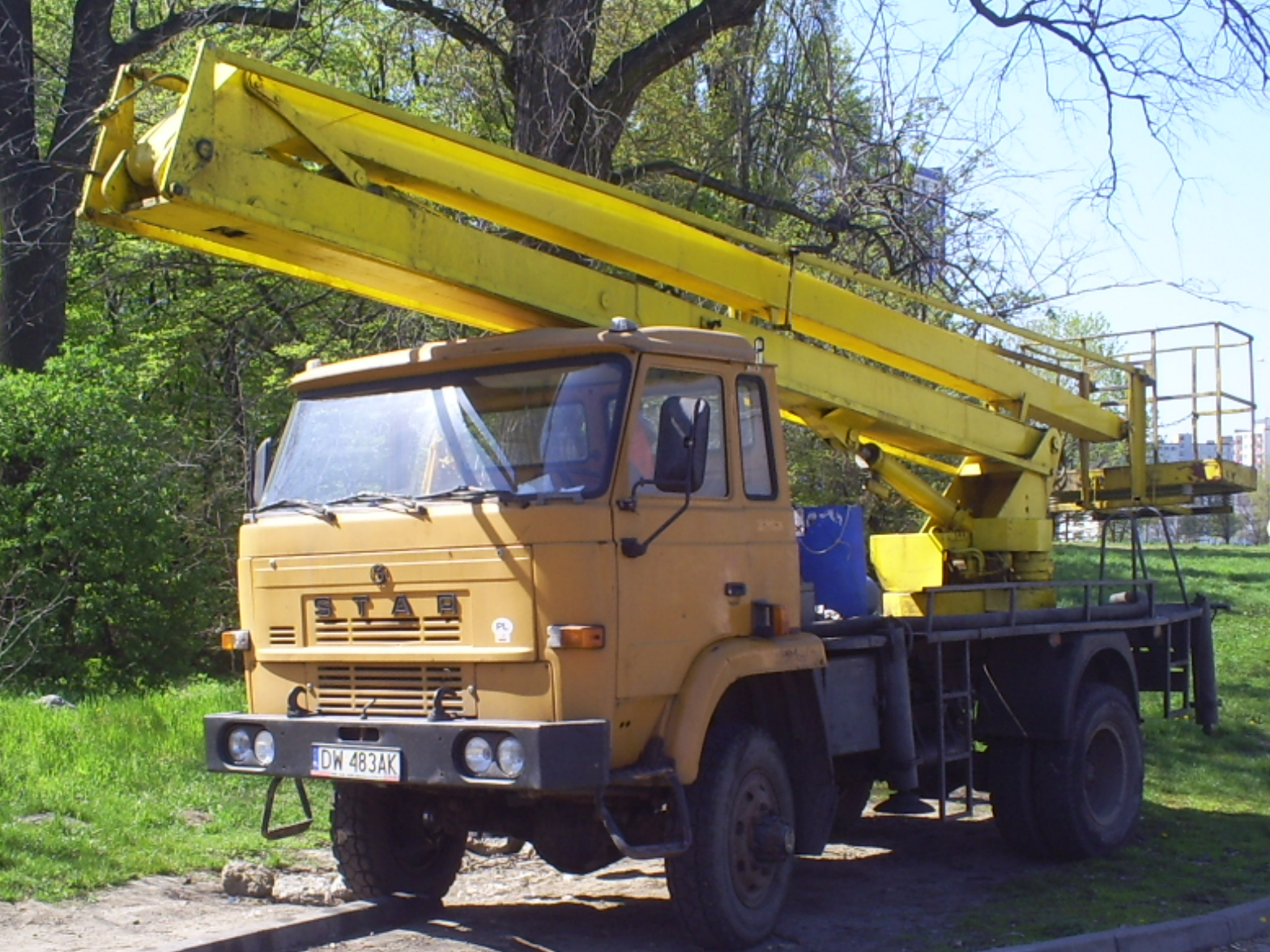
Star 244 (4X4)

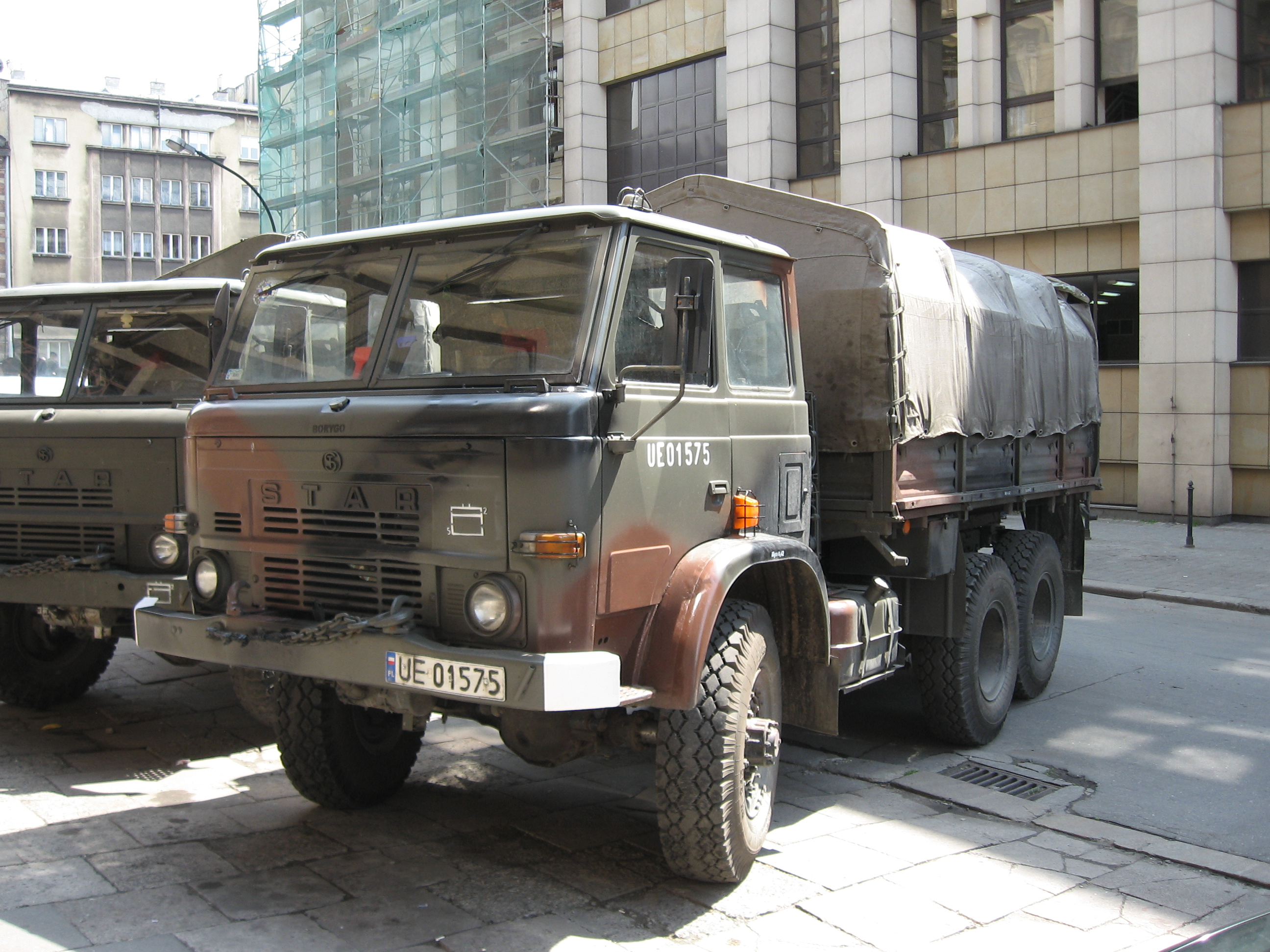
Star 266 (6X6)

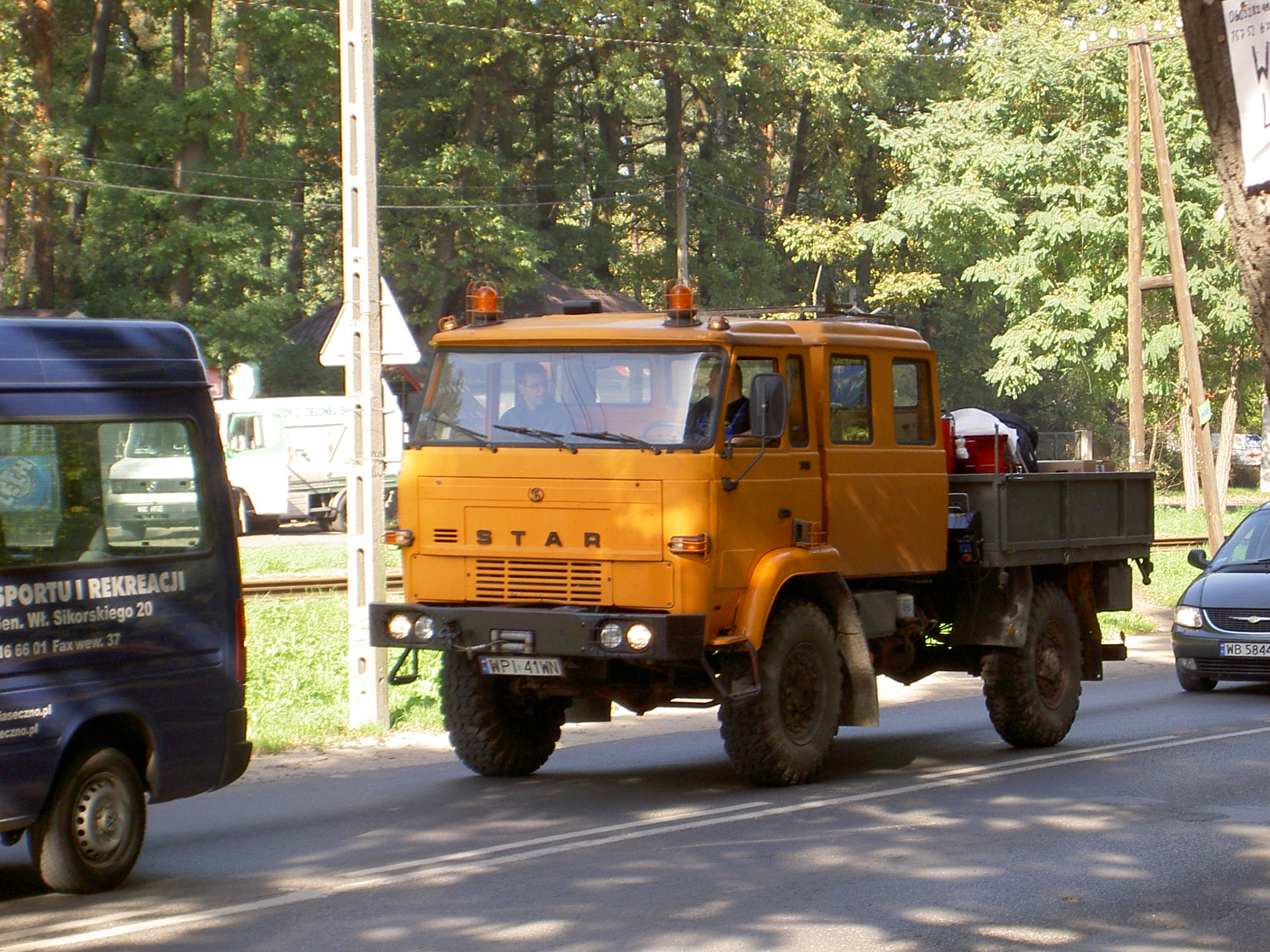
Star 744

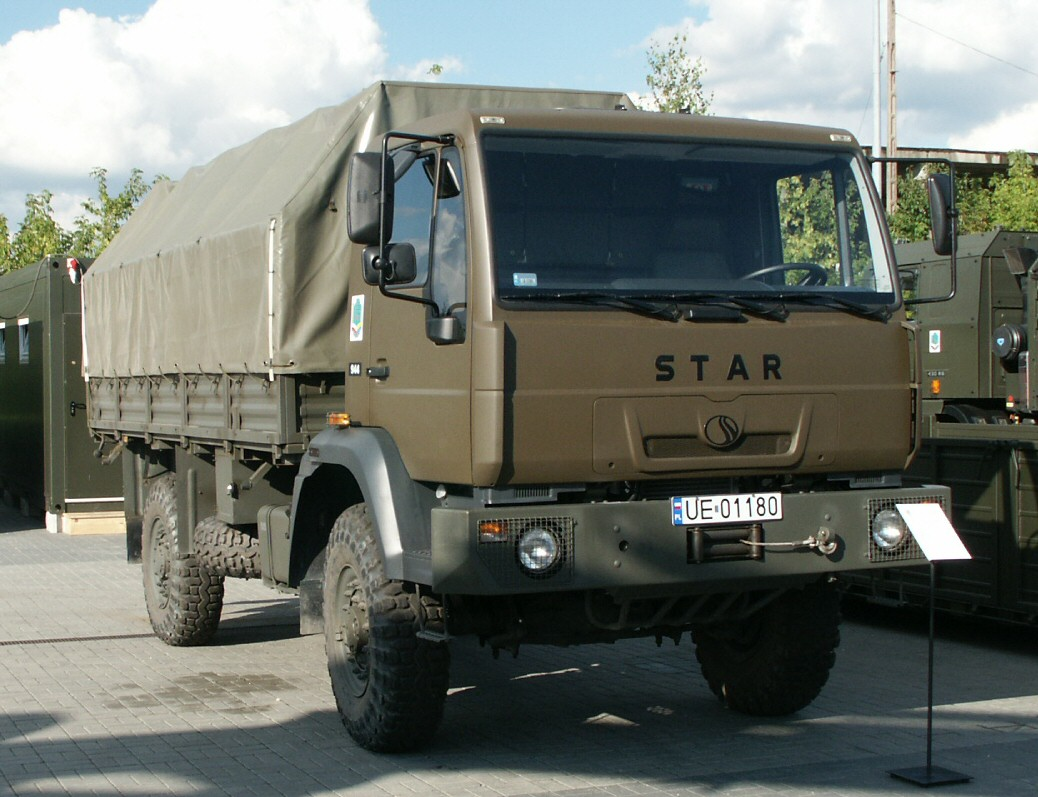
Star 944

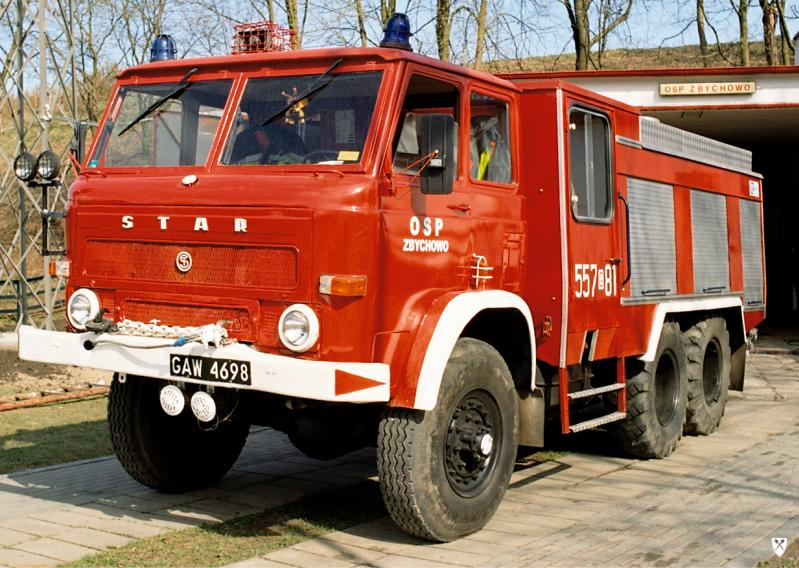
Star 266 firetruck

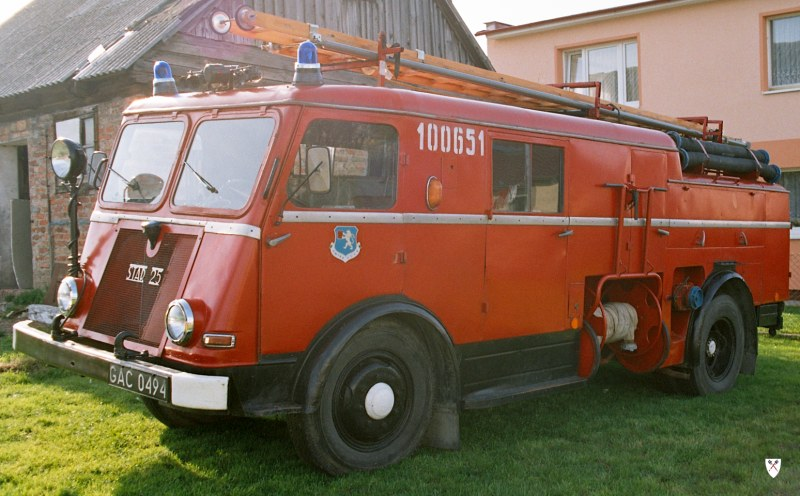
1971 Star 25 firetruck.

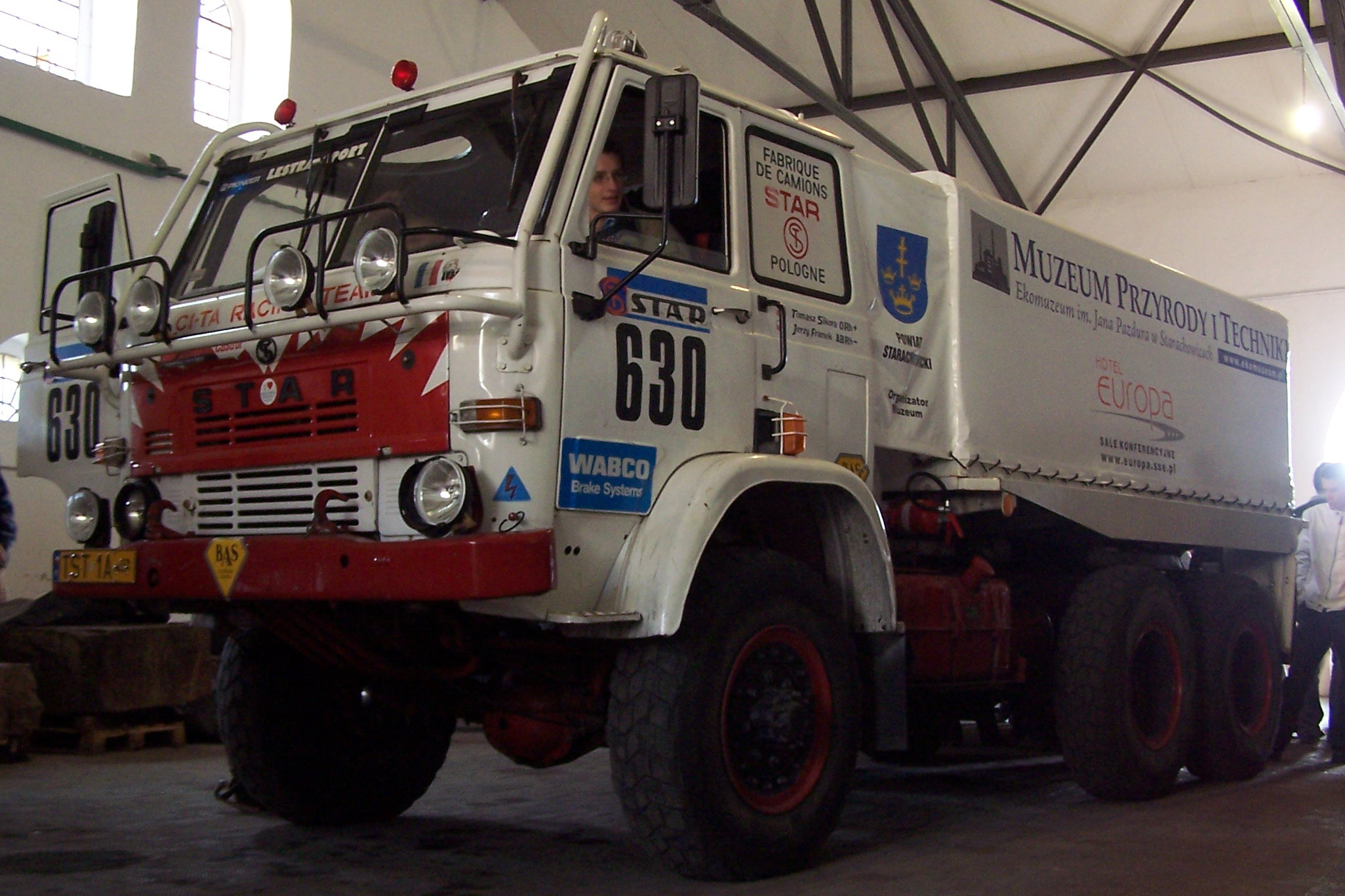
Star 266, in the Paris to Dakar Rally.

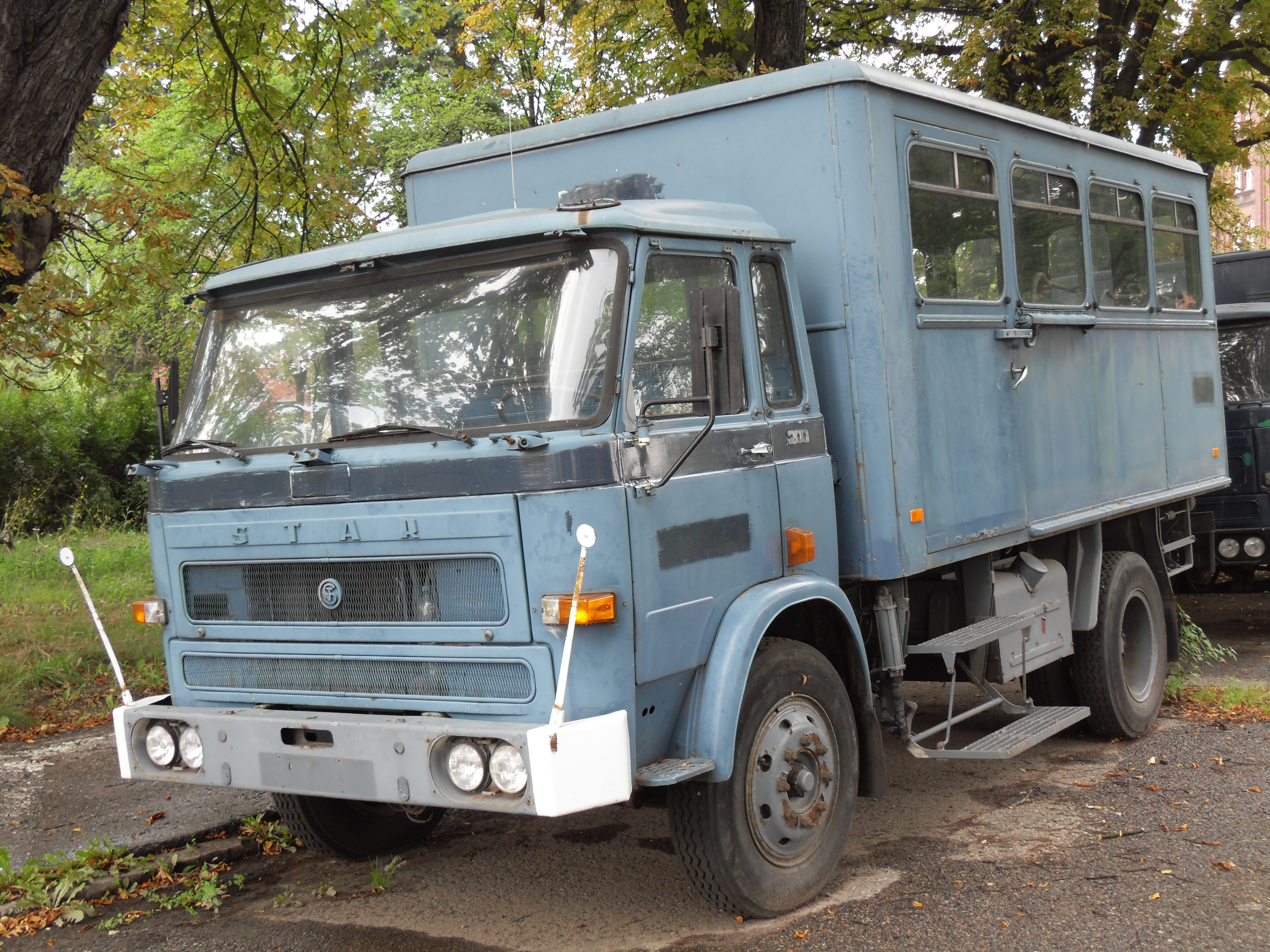
Star 200 truckbus with passengers bodywork for the Milicja in Poland.

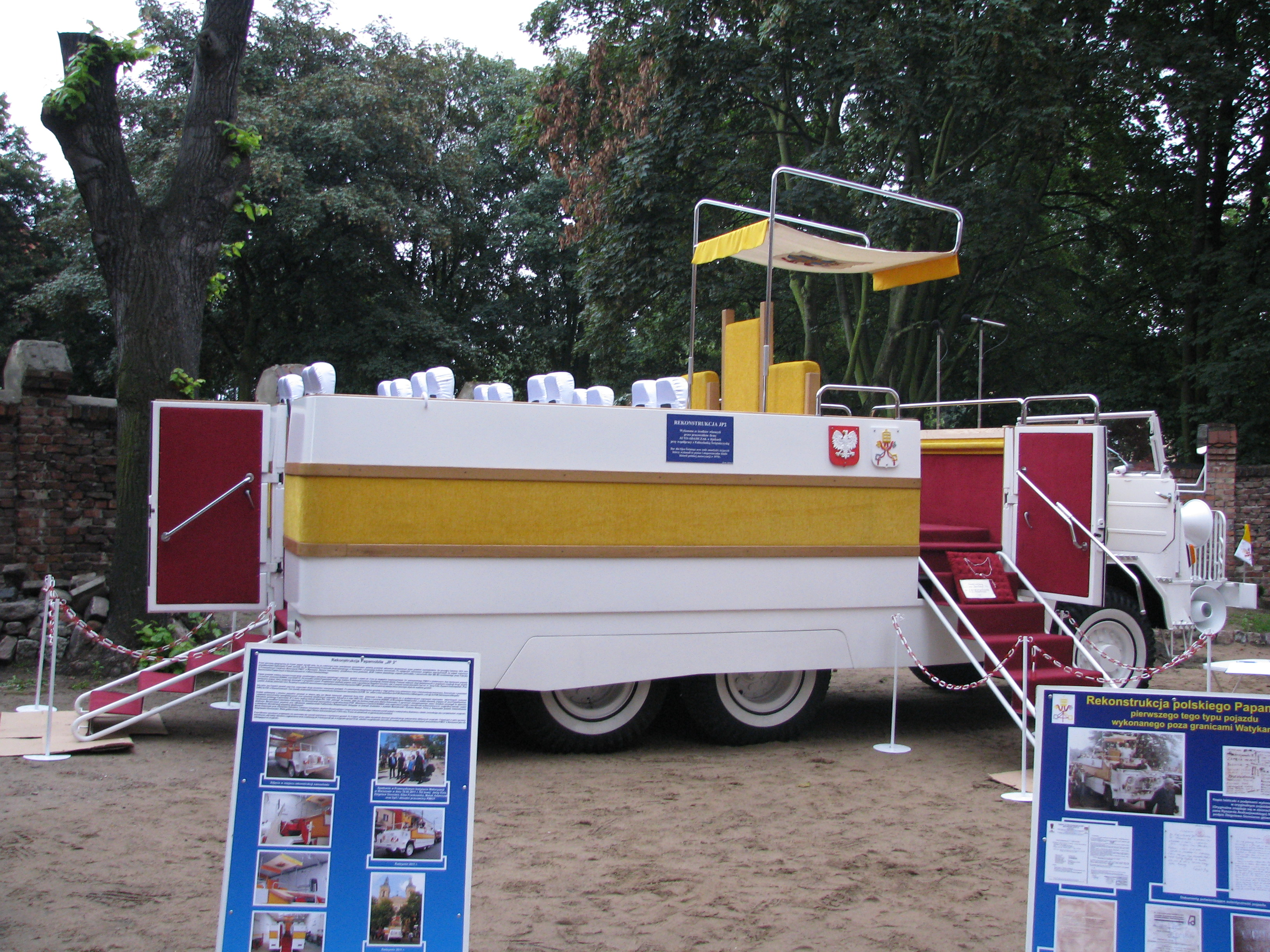
Star 660 based Pope mobile
