= Star 200 =

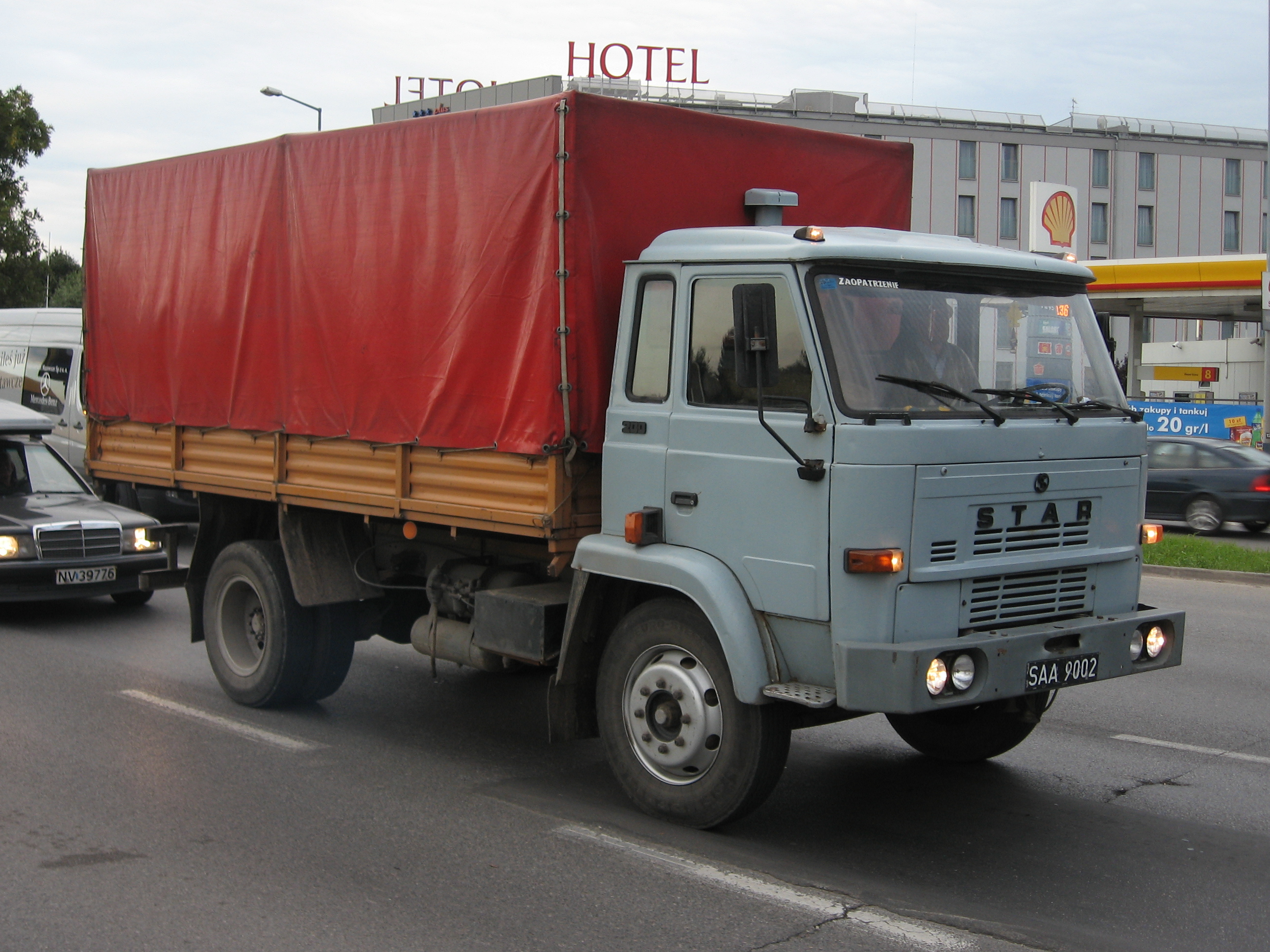

Overview
- Manufacturer: FSC Star
- Production: 1976-1994
- Assembly: Poland

Body and chassis
- Class: Truck
- Body style: 2-door standard cab
- Related: Star 244, Star 266

Powertrain
- Engine: 6,8L S359 V6
- Transmission: 5-speed manual

Dimensions
- Length: 6430 mm
- Width: 2480 mm
- Height: 3800 mm
- Curb weight: 4800 kg

Chronology
- Predecessor: Star 28/29
- Successor: Star 1142

The Star 200 is a Polish truck produced in 1976-1994 by FSC Star in Starachowice, Poland. It is the successor to the Star 28/29.

== History ==
The first prototypes of the Star 200 car were created at the turn of 1964-1965. They were first shown to the public in 1966. Problems with implementing production (in the centrally managed economy of the Polish People's Republic there was a constant lack of funds for investments) resulted in the creation of transitional models Star 28 (with a diesel engine) and Star 29 (with a petrol engine) based on the drive systems from the Star 25 and Star 27 models. They used some of the components developed for the Star 200 model, the production of which had already been mastered.

The new, wagon-like driver's cabin, permanently mounted above the engine, provided good working conditions for the driver in the first period of production (in the 1980s, tilting cabins became standard, which were not introduced until the Star 1142 model). It was richly glazed, the driver had good visibility through the panoramic windscreen without a center pillar. The cabin was designed domestically, but the French company Chausson was used to develop the equipment and technology for serial production. The cabin doors open forward, the driver's and passenger seats have longitudinal adjustment (without shock absorption). The cabin was equipped with heating and ventilation devices and was better soundproofed. The cargo box was steel with a wooden floor, it was possible to transport loads weighing up to 6,000 kg. The curb weight of the car is 4,200 kg. The Star 200 can tow a trailer with a total weight of up to 8,500 kg. 6-cylinder in-line engine of the Star S359 type (in later versions the modernized Star S359M engine, a naturally aspirated diesel engine with direct injection, developed in cooperation with the Austrian AVL institute. The engine block was initially cast from aluminum (supplier from Hungary), later on, blocks cast from cast iron in Poland were used (unfortunately much heavier but more durable). The forged crankshaft is mounted in 7 bearings, the aluminum pistons contain internal toroidal swirl combustion chambers, and the engine head consists of three two-cylinder segments made of special cast iron. The new fuel pump and injectors were supplied by WSK Mielec. Sometimes the Stara 200 was also equipped with the SW-400 engine (so-called small Leyland) with a capacity of 6540 cm³ and power of 115 HP, which was manufactured in the Andoria plants under license from the English company Leyland Motors. This engine It was slightly weaker than the S359, but it gained popularity due to its greater durability and lower fuel consumption, as well as quieter operation. The power to total vehicle weight ratio — 14.1 HP/ton — matched the truck designs of the time. The gearbox manufactured by FPS Tczew under the license of the German company ZF, type: AK5 - 45, has 5 non-synchronized (in later years in the S5-45 gearbox - synchronized) forward gears, plus reverse gear. A new single-stage drive axle manufactured by FSC Star. The vehicle uses hydraulic drum brakes on both axles, dual-circuit, with pneumatic assistance. The modern pneumatic installation was based on elements manufactured by Polmo Praszka under the license of Westinghouse. The breakthrough was the use of polyamide pneumatic lines instead of steel ones (often rusting and cracking) used in previous models. The suspension of the vehicle, in addition to the longitudinal semi-elliptical leaf springs, consisted of additional rubber shock absorbers, and on the front axle also FA Krosno telescopic shock absorbers manufactured under Armstrong license. The Star 200 consumed approximately 18-19 l of diesel fuel per 100 km at a speed of 85-90 km/h. The production of Star cars took place on modernized machines, imported from Italy, among others. Considerable sums were allocated for the modernization of the entire FSC in Starachowice. The Star 200 was therefore manufactured in large series (as for trucks) and using modern methods. A version with 4-wheel drive was also created (Star 244), and the engine and modernized (synchronized) gearbox were successfully used in the construction of a modern military off-road vehicle (Star 266). In 1986, production of the very thoroughly modernized Star 1142 model began, although the Star 200 was produced for another eight years, being by then an outdated design.

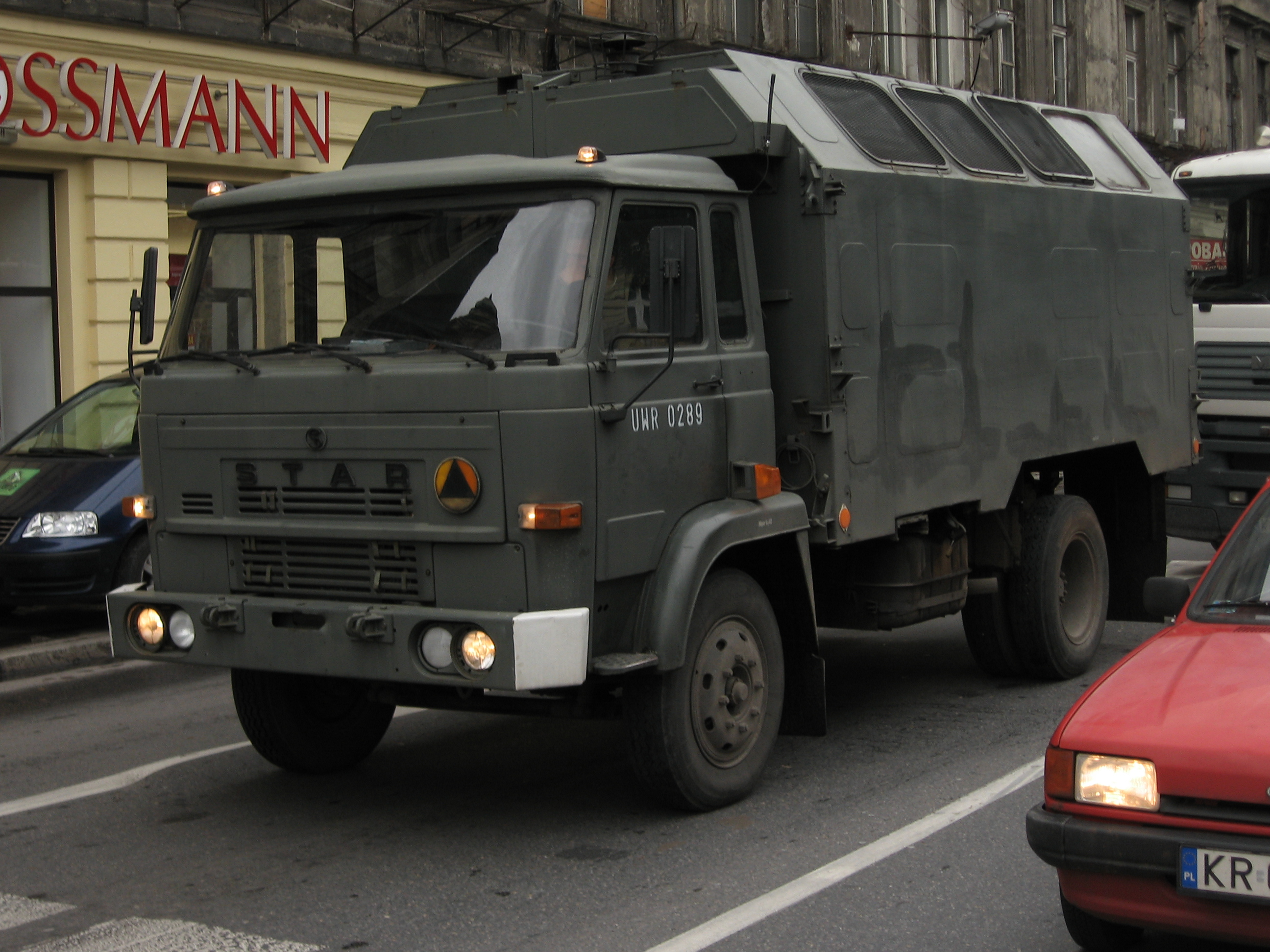
Star 200 military version

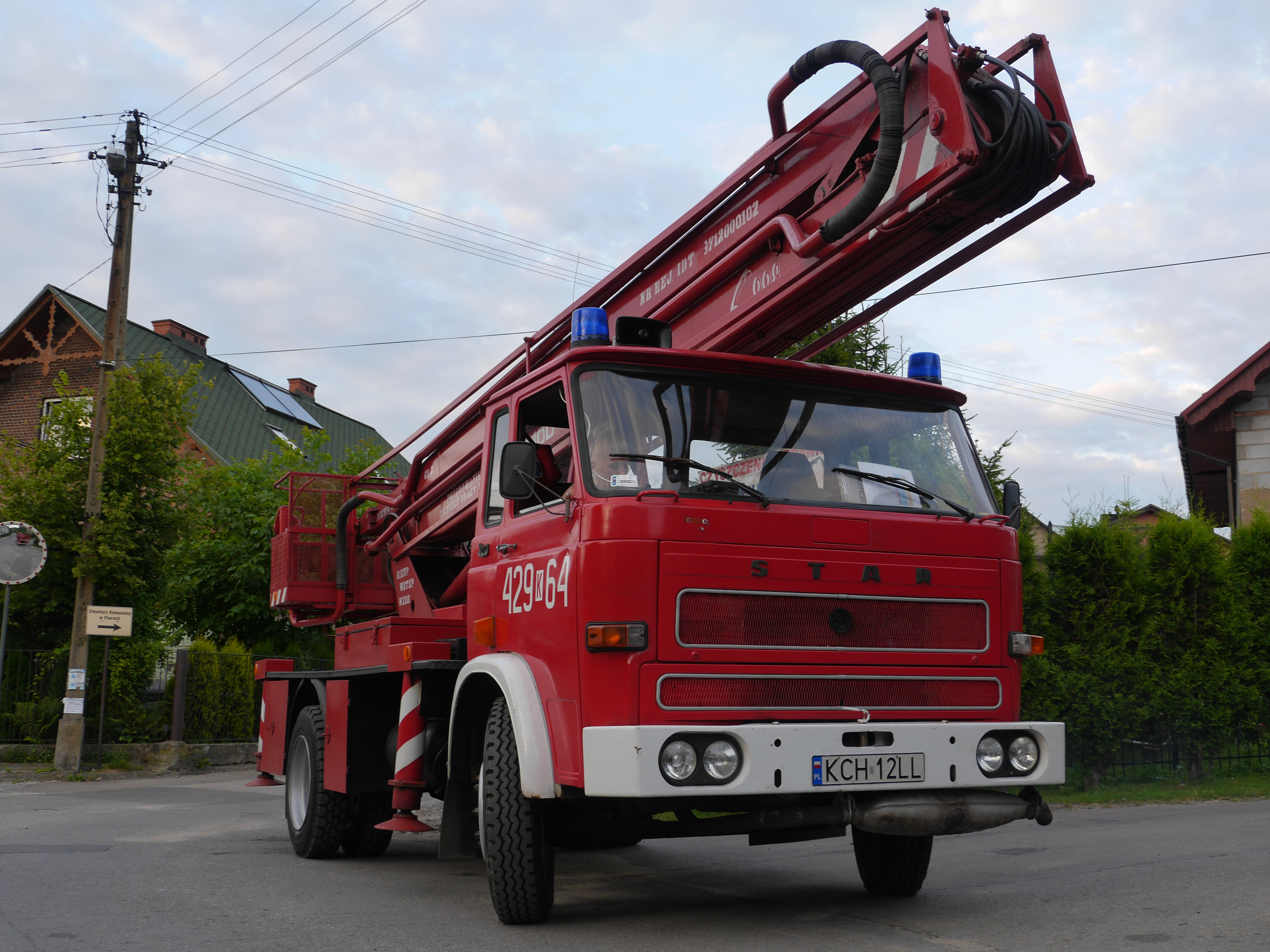
Star 200 fire truck

5,012 Star 200 vehicles were delivered to the Polish People's Army.

== Modernization and development ==
The Star 200 underwent modernisation during its production period resulting from operational experience, including the redesigned/reinforced bearing of the differential pinion, and a whole range of changes involving the introduction of elements from its successor, the Star 1142 model, which was being prepared for production, including in 1986 the front of the cabin (engine covers) was modified, a deeper embossed cabin roof was introduced, new front wheel covers with mudguards, in 1982 shortened cabin doors with new seals and lower external handles (from the Polski Fiat 126) and new panoramic external mirrors, a new set of clocks, new seats and black plastic upholstery of the cabin interior (instead of the previously used fibreboard) and anti-slip floor coverings in black were introduced. Also in 1982. 3 wiper arms instead of 2 were used, which significantly increased the surface area cleaned by them, and the flap protecting the radiator fluid filler cap was eliminated, and the archaic air intakes above the windscreen were removed. The wiring and electrical system (based on technologies from FSO Polonez but in the 24 V version) and the pneumatic system (three separate compressed air tanks instead of one multi-chamber tank) were modernized. The fuel tank mount was redesigned, reducing its weight and eliminating the problem of tank corrosion that often appeared in the old solution. Similarly to the Star 1142 model, the previously used solution of the chassis frame base with variable height of the "C" profile was changed to one with the same height along the entire length. In the Star 200 version with a wheelbase extended to 3900 mm, the so-called Star 200L, a cargo box with lighter sides and removable pillars was used, as well as a side mount for the spare wheel from the Star 1142 model.

== Users ==
- Poland
- China: 5,600 trucks were delivered in 1985-1986
