= Star 1466 =

Polish military truck

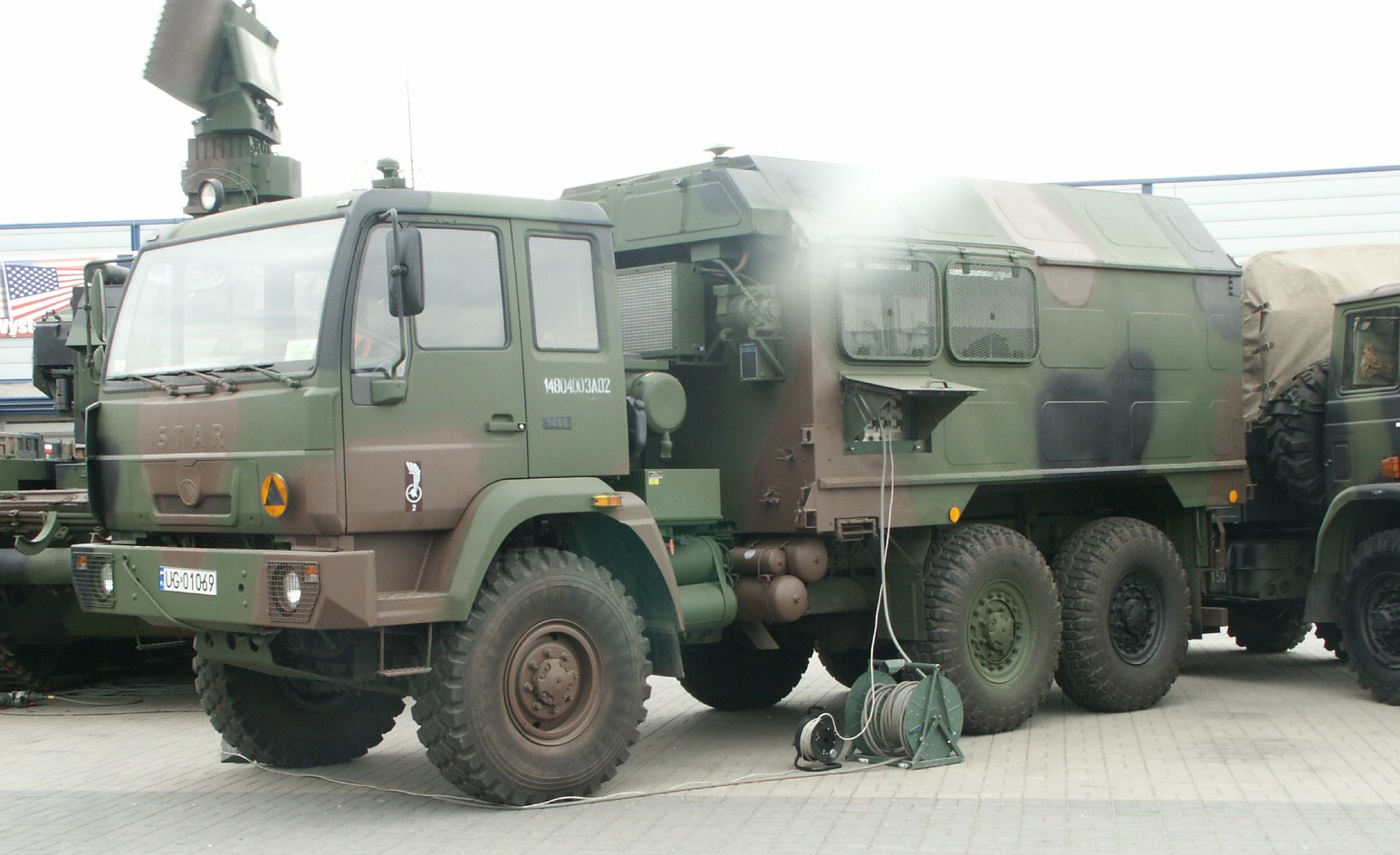

Overview
- Manufacturer: Star Trucks / MAN Star Trucks & Buses
- Production: 2001 - 2006
- Assembly: Starachowice, Poland

Body and chassis
- Class: 6x6 Truck
- Related: Star 944, Star 1444

Powertrain
- Engine: MAN D0826LFG15 220 HP diesel
- Transmission: ZF 6S850 6-speed

Chronology
- Predecessor: Star 266
- Successor: Star 1444

The Star 1466 is a tri-axle (6x6) truck in service with the Polish Armed Forces. Produced by Star Trucks (later MAN Star Trucks & Buses), the truck was designed as a replacement for the Star 266, which was phased out of production in 2000. The truck was produced between 2001 and 2006, after which it was succeeded by the Star 1444.

The truck, first shown in 1999, utilized MAN components, like crew cab and engine. The same year MAN became an owner of Star Trucks. As a result of MAN policy to gather truck construction in Steyr works, in 2006 it was decided to stop truck manufacturing in Starachowice and this put an end to Polish-designed Star 1466.

Polish Army ordered only small quantities of these trucks – 75 were delivered in 2000-2007.

150 were sold to Yemen, as a part of Star 266 contract.

== History ==
The off-road Star 1466 belongs to the last generation of this brand's trucks, designed in the Starachowice plant in the late 1990s, specifically for the needs of the Polish Army. It was to be a heavier successor to the mass-used three-axle Star 266 off-road truck from the 1970s, which was the basic means of tactical transport in the Polish Army, with a total weight of about 11 tons. The first attempt to replace it was the three-axle Star 1366 model from the late 1980s, which introduced, among other things, a tilting cabin, but remained a prototype. As a result of cooperation with the MAN concern, established in 1998, the next generation of Star developed in Starachowice used key components produced by MAN, primarily modern engines and cabins (from the L2000 series). This process intensified after the sale of the Star plant to MAN in December 1999. The 1466 model designation comes from the permissible total weight of 14 tons and the 6×6 drive, while the payload is 6 tons. The same generation also included the lighter 12-ton three-axle Star 1266 and the 9/10-ton two-axle Star 944, but only the 1466 and 944 models were ultimately put into production. The prototype of the Star 1466 was presented in September 1999 at the MSPO in Kielce, where it was awarded the Defender award.

Among the new three-axle models, after conducting tests and studies, it was decided to implement only the 1466 model into production in 2001, which, in addition to a greater payload, also had a 65 HP more powerful engine.

In 2006, the MAN concern, as part of its corporate policy, decided to end the assembly of the Star 1466 in Starachowice and all trucks of its own design at the Star plant, which was related, among other things, to the discontinuation of production of cabins of this type in Europe and the concentration of truck production in the Austrian plant in Steyr. Earlier, this design had not been promoted abroad for military applications by the plant owner, despite the potential possibility of export.

The Polish Army ordered only small numbers of Star 1466 trucks, used mainly as a base for special bodies. The basic truck replacing the Star 266 as a tactical transport vehicle was the lighter Star 944. In 2000, the army purchased 2 Star 1466s, then 8 in 2003, 10 in 2004, 5 in 2005 and 40 in 2006. In 2007, the army received the last 10 Star 1466s, thus increasing their number to 75.

As a successor for the army, MAN proposed the two-axle 14-ton Star 1444 truck manufactured in Austria. However, the Polish Army did not choose a new typical medium-duty truck for the next few years and did not order any more off-road trucks from MAN. The successor of the Star 1466 in terms of vehicles for bodies was the heavier Jelcz P662D.35 manufactured in Poland.

In addition to the Polish Army, 150 Star 1466s were sold to Yemen as part of the last tranche of the contract for the original 550 Star 266s (it is emphasized that by renegotiating the contract, MAN secured the sale of vehicles using more components manufactured in other factories of the concern outside Poland).

Limited quantities of Star 1466s were sold for specific applications on the civilian market, for example for energy services or fire brigades. Among other things, in addition to fire trucks, in 2003 the State Fire Service purchased 16 box trucks for individual provincial headquarters of the State Fire Service.

The Waran ammunition vehicle for AHS Krab self-propelled gun-howitzers was to be based on the Star 1466 chassis. By 2004, its prototype had been manufactured and tested, but then, after a break of several years in the Krab program, due to the discontinuation of Star production, the army decided on Jelcz 882.53 trucks in the 8x8 Jelcz configuration.

== Design ==
The drive is an inline 6-cylinder turbocharged diesel engine MAN D0826 LFG15 with a displacement of 6.87 l, meeting the Euro 2 standard. It develops a maximum power of 162 kW (220 HP) at 2400 rpm and reaches a maximum torque of 820 Nm at 1500 rpm. The engine was coupled with a ZF 6S850 mechanical gearbox with 6 forward and 1 reverse gears and a Steyr VG750 transfer case with a differential and a two-stage off-road reduction gear (gear ratios: 1:1 and off-road 1:2). According to other sources, the transfer case is of the MAN G1000-2 type. The single-disc clutch is Fichtel&Sachs MFZ 395. Single-stage drive axles with a gear ratio of 6.33 have differential locks. The braking system is dual-circuit, drum-shoe, with ABS. Emergency and parking brakes acting on the middle and rear wheels. Single tires in size 14.00R20. Maximum speed is 86 km/h. Single-wire electrical system has a voltage of 24 V, waterproof, shielded, adapted for driving in dark conditions. The vehicle is adapted for fording.

The vehicle can be equipped with a short two-seater day cab, a long two-seater cab with a bed or an extended four-door crew cab for 4-6 people. All cabs are hydraulically tilted forward for access to the engine. The Star 1466 chassis can be fitted with various body versions, such as a cargo box, tank, apparatus, workshop, container, and ammunition transport bodies. The standard body has dimensions of 4440/2440/500 mm and can hold 10 euro pallets. The equipment includes a winch with a pulling force of 60 kN. The first body version presented at MSPO in 1999 was a version with an extended four-door cabin and a BM-21M rocket launcher, which, however, did not enter service in this form. In 2002, a version with 450 kg armor mounted on the cabin was presented.

The tactical payload of the Star 1466 is 6 tons, and it can tow a trailer weighing 8.5 tons. The vehicle can ford 1.2 m deep water.

== Users ==
- Poland
- Yemen
