= Star 244 =

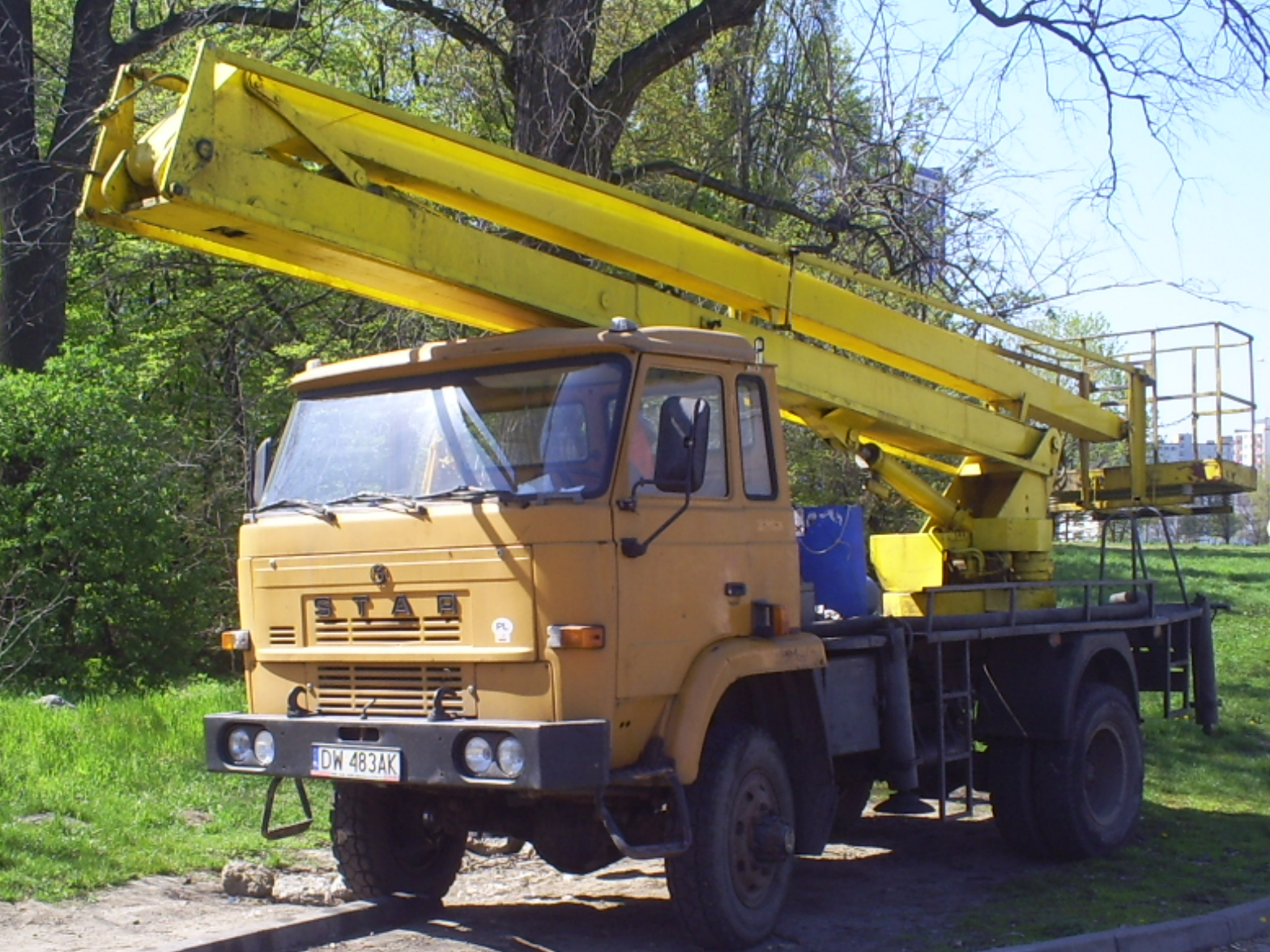

Overview
- Manufacturer: FSC Star
- Production: 1975-2000
- Assembly: Poland

Body and chassis
- Class: 4x4 Truck
- Body style: 2-door standard cab
- Related: Star 200, Star 266

Powertrain
- Engine: 6,8L S359 R6
- Transmission: 5-speed manual

Dimensions
- Length: 5215 mm - 6850 mm
- Width: 2660 mm
- Height: 2625 mm
- Curb weight: 5500 kg

Chronology
- Successor: Star 744

The Star 244 is a Polish 2 axle straight truck produced by FSC Star in Starachowice from 1975 to 2000.

== History ==
=== Experimental prototype ===
At the turn of 1969–1970, a trial batch of 10 units of the Star 200 model was made, and with it an experimental model of the 244 model. The vehicle in military colors, with a cargo box and tarpaulin was developed and tested in cooperation with the Military Institute of Armored and Automotive Technology in Sulejówek (similarly to the Star 266). Built on the basis of the Star 200 components, the design was to be a response to the needs of industries such as agriculture, forestry, construction, and energy as well as for use by uniformed services.

=== Star 244 series model ===
The serial model 244 was presented in 1975 as a chassis and a box truck. A trial batch of 50 units was assembled at the FSC Technical Facilities Plant. The 642 type cabin had two seats, with heating and ventilation. The heart of the vehicle was the S359 straight-six engine, with a displacement of 6842 cm^{3} and a power of 150 HP (110 kW). The maximum speed was 82 km/h and fuel consumption 26 l/100 km. The drive was transferred to the four wheels via a 5-speed ZF S5-45 gearbox, and a 2-speed transfer case. The truck's load capacity was 5000 kg. Suspension on semi-elliptical springs was used at the front and rear. The Star 244 could overcome water obstacles 120 cm deep (due to the air filter placed low behind the rear left wheel arch of the cabin), and climbs with a longitudinal slope of up to 45° and a transverse slope of 26°. It had approach/departure angles of 40°/27° respectively.

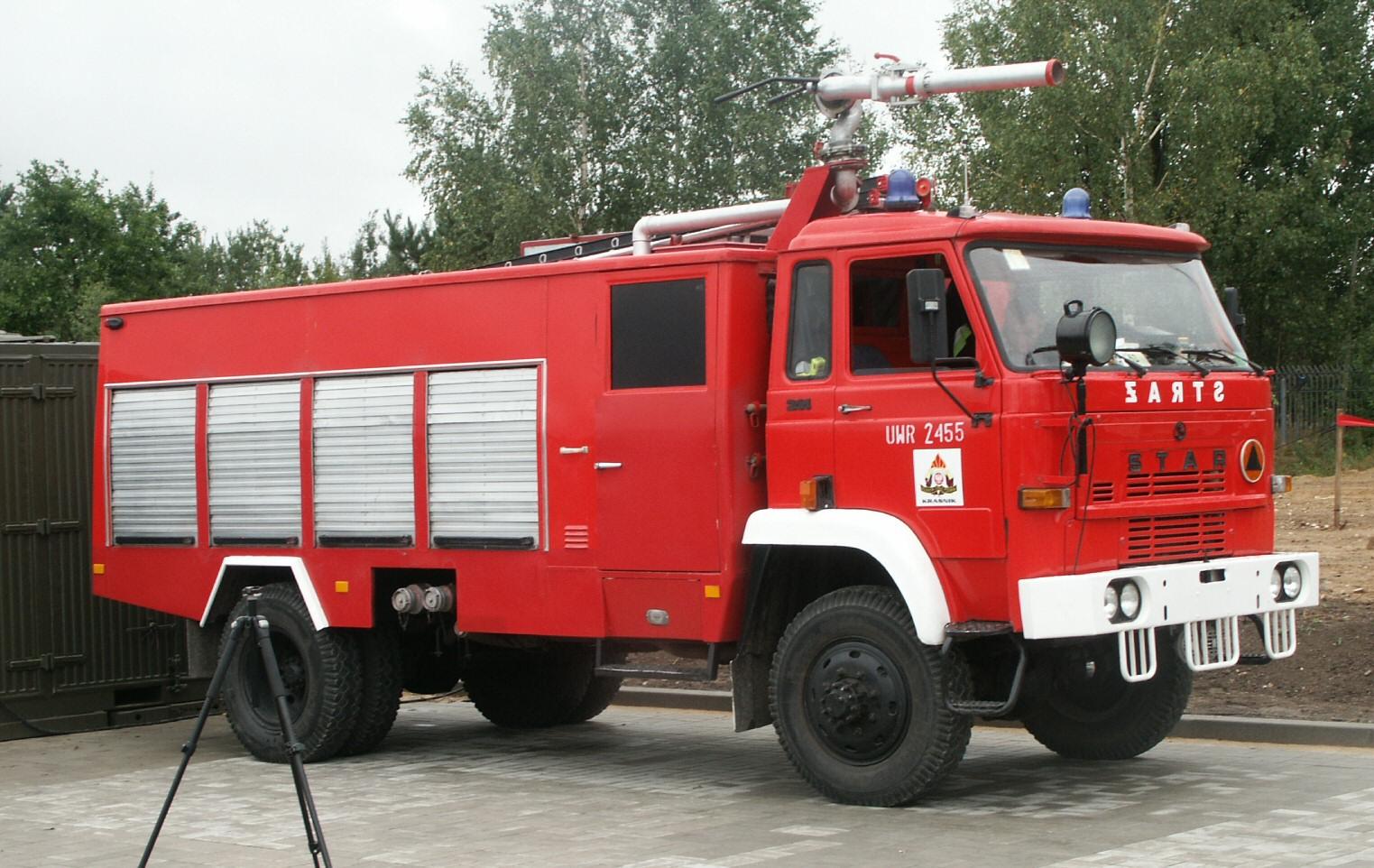
Star 244L fire truck

=== Other variants ===
- Star 3W244 – a version with a self-unloading body manufactured by SHL-Kielce, presented in 1976.
- Star 244R – a vehicle equipped with a self-unloading cargo box known from the rigid version, developed in 1977 for agricultural needs.
- Star 244RS – was created in response to the needs of agriculture and large-scale farms. The factory concluded an agreement with the Union of Technical Agricultural Service, according to which the special equipment of the new version was to be manufactured in one of the subordinate facilities. The expected production was to be around 2-2.5 thousand. The State Machinery Center in Lubsko in the Zielona Góra province was chosen. The so-called tight cargo box was made there. The first batch of 50 cars was made in 1979. Thanks to the 4x4 drive, the car could work in difficult terrain conditions. The reduction gear allowed driving in the range of 3 to 82 km/h. This meant that it could work with all agricultural machines during field work. The aforementioned cargo box had a capacity of 4.0/6.5/15.0 m^{3} (low/with overlays/with extension), respectively. It was closed/opened using a roller-cable system and adapted for mounting a tarpaulin cover. The vehicle had a load capacity of 5,000 kg, a total weight of 11,050 kg, and with a trailer 19,555 kg. The design differed from the other versions in the use of solutions from the military Star 266. The multi-cycle air filter was placed on the rear wall of the cabin on the passenger side. Thanks to it, the Star 244RS could work in low visibility - up to 1.5 g/m^{3} (normally 0.05-0.08 g/m^{3}). The use of additional sealing of rubber elements and bearings against water, and sealing of the lamps allowed for work at 98% humidity. The aforementioned solutions also allowed overcoming water obstacles up to 180 cm deep. It was the shortest series of Star trucks.
- Star 244L – extended model, presented at the Poznań International Fair in 1978. Version 244L received a type "005" fire-fighting body made at the Jelcz Automotive Works.
- Star 3W244R – developed and assembled (50 units) by SHL-Kielce in 1978. It was a three-way tipper for transporting agricultural produce, with a load capacity of 5,000 kg, equipped with raised sides.
