= Star 266 =

Polish 6x6 truck

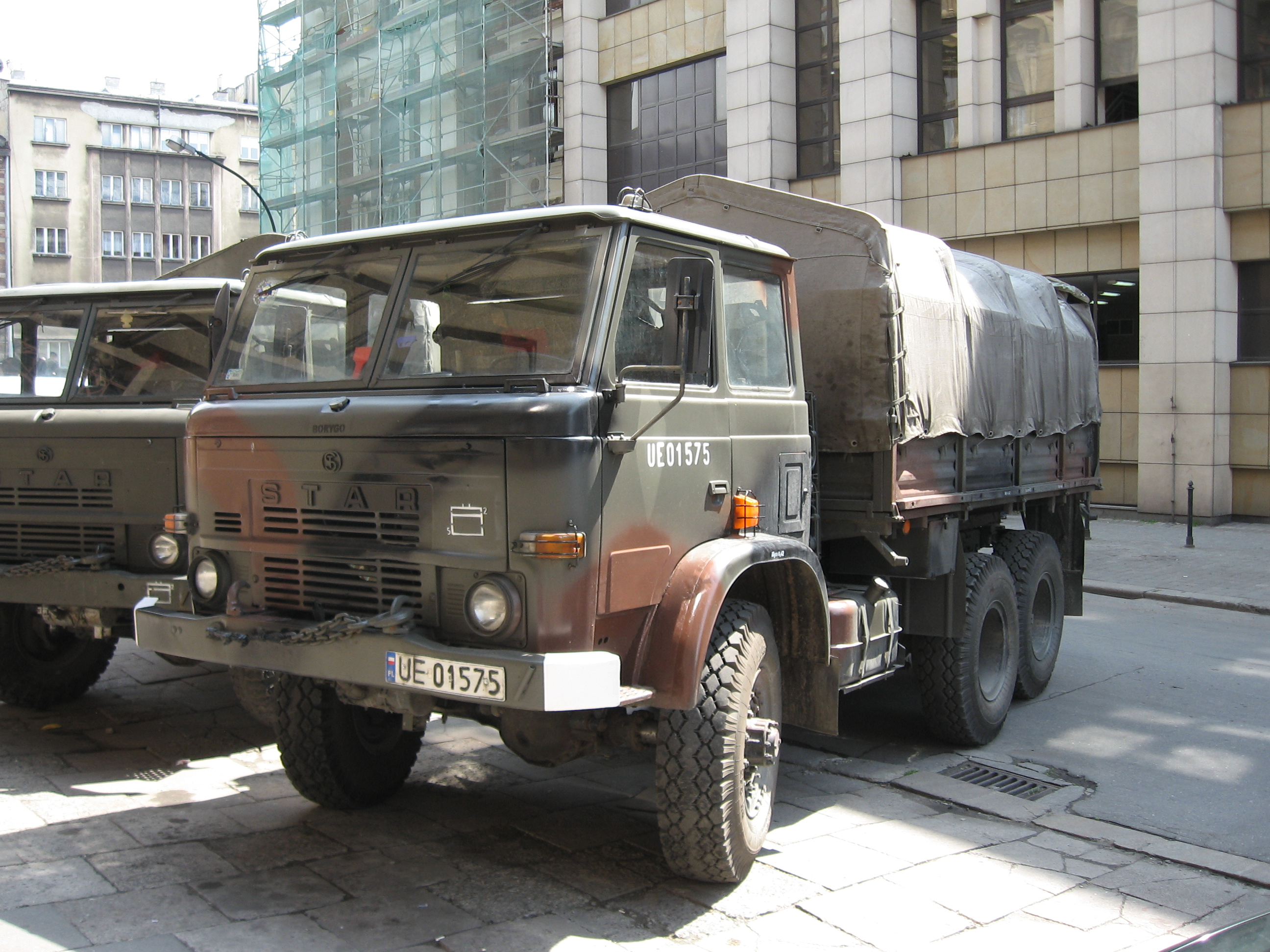

Overview
- Manufacturer: FSC Star
- Production: 1973 - 2000
- Assembly: Poland

Body and chassis
- Class: 6x6 Truck
- Related: Star 200, Star 244

Powertrain
- Engine: STAR 359/359M 6-cylinder diesel 150 hp
- Transmission: S5-45 5-speed

Dimensions
- Length: 6820 mm
- Width: 2500 mm
- Height: 2660 mm - 3155 mm
- Curb weight: 7.35 tonnes

Chronology
- Predecessor: Star 660
- Successor: Star 1466

The Star 266 is a Polish 6x6 truck designed for transport of cargo and personnel. Created by Starachowice-based FSC Star, it was the basic transport truck used by the Polish Army. It was also available to the civilian market. A successor to the highly successful Star 660 series of trucks, the Star 266 shared many components with earlier models, including Star 200 and Star 244 multi-purpose medium-capacity trucks.

The truck could transport up to 3500 kilograms (7716 lbs) cross-country and up to 5000 kg (11023 lbs) on paved roads. It could also tow trailers of up to 4000 kg (8818 lbs). As a truck designed primarily with military service in mind, it can ford rivers and mud of between 120 and 180 centimetres of depth. It was initially equipped with a 6-cylinder S359 diesel engine (6842 cm³, 150 HP).

The design works started in 1968. The following year the first prototypes were ready. Between 1970 and 1973 the vehicle was prepared to enter serial production which it did in 1973. It remained in production until 2000, when it was replaced by Star 1466.

== Usage ==
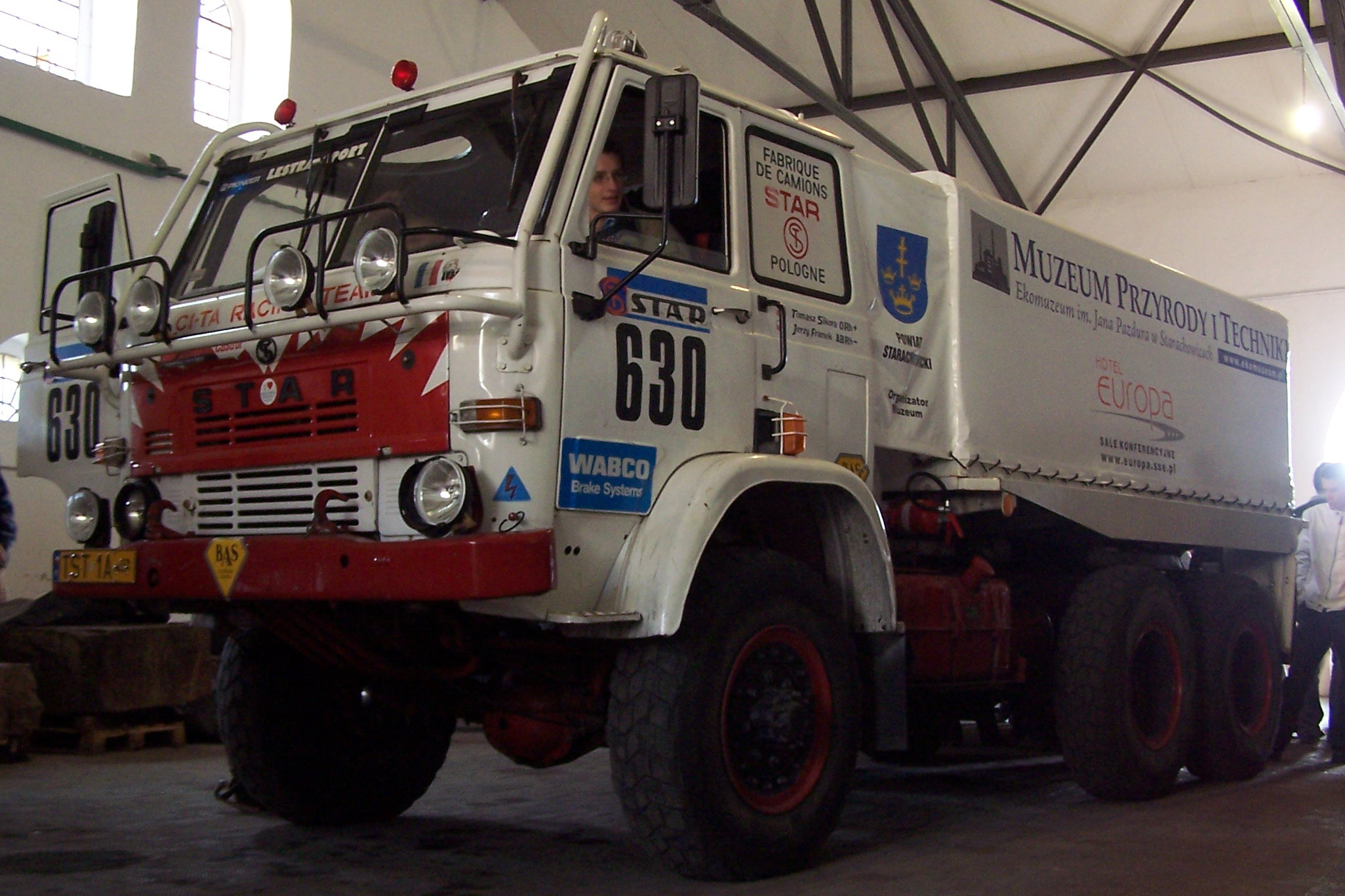
One of the two Star 266 trucks used for the 1988 Dakar Rally in Nature and Technology Museum in Starachowice.

Star 266 was first all adopted as a basic military tactical truck, but was also used as civilian truck, especially for services needing high mobility, like a mobile workshop for energetics. It also served as a basis for several civilian vehicles including fire engines and truck-mounted cranes. Fire Engines and Energetic Services still use this truck because of its durability and ease of repairs in poor weather and terrain conditions.

Two specially modified Star 266 trucks took part in the 1988 Dakar Rally. One crew included Tomasz Sikora and Jerzy Franek, the second crew consisted of Jerzy Mazur and Julian Obornicki. Both trucks reached the finish line in Senegal but they went over the delay limit and were therefore disqualified. One of the trucks is currently in Muzeum Przyrody i Techniki (Nature and Technology Museum) in Starachowice, the hometown of the truck.

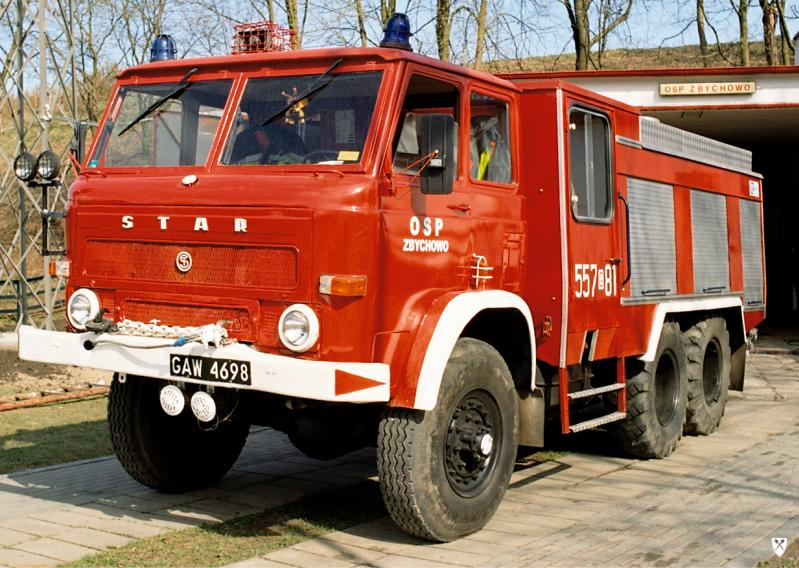
Fire Engine used by Volunteer Fire Brigade. Somewhere in the 70's or 80's

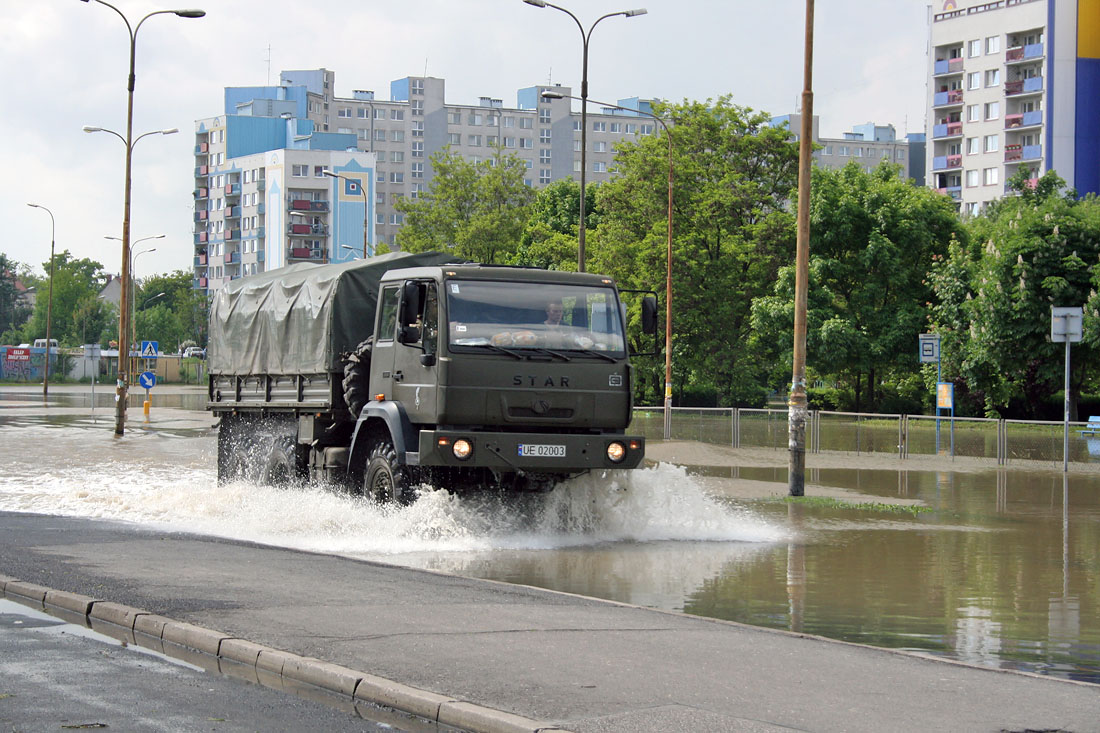
Modernised Star 228M during Wroclaw flood of 2010

Star 266 is a basic medium-capacity transport vehicle of the Polish Armed Forces and as such is used for a number of different tasks. Polish Army also uses the modernized variant of Star 266 known as Star 266M. Star 266 also served as basis for a number of different vehicles including CD-5 tanker trucks which are used for transport of liquid fuel by supply platoons of tank and mechanized battalions, GD-2 smokescreen generation vehicles, truck-mounted cranes, excavators, WUS-3 and IRS special vehicles used for disinfection and chemical recon, deactivation and decontamination of vehicles, terrain, equipment and buildings, ADK-11 command vehicles as well as Star-266 AP-64 and Star-266 BP-64 special transport vehicles used for transporting the elements of the PP-64 Wstęga pontoon bridge.

== Variants ==
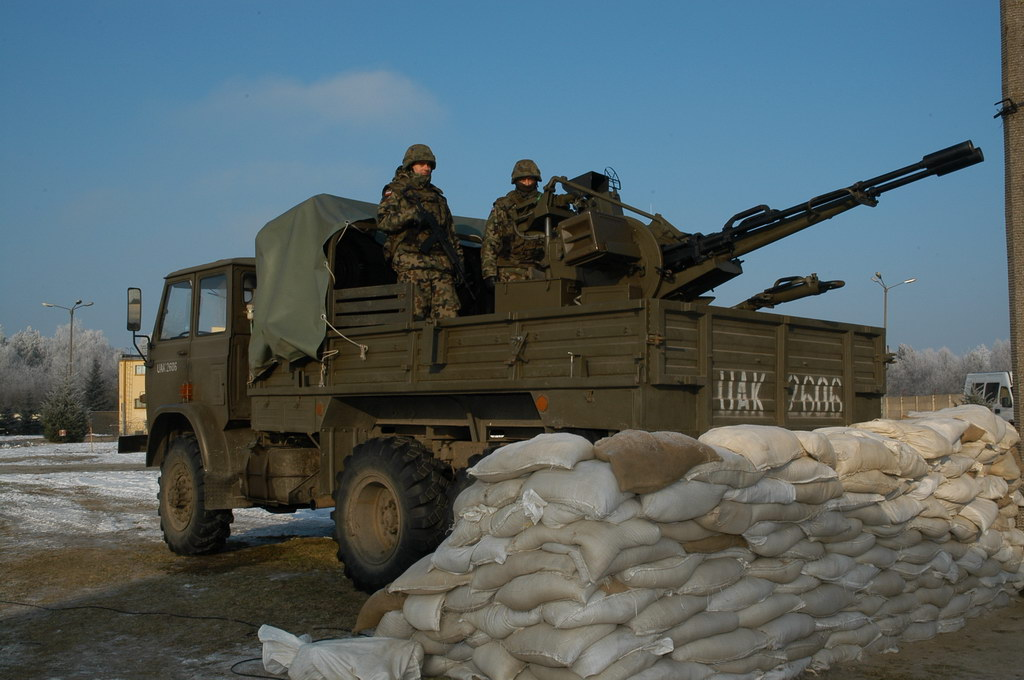
Hibneryt self-propelled anti-aircraft gun on a firing position.

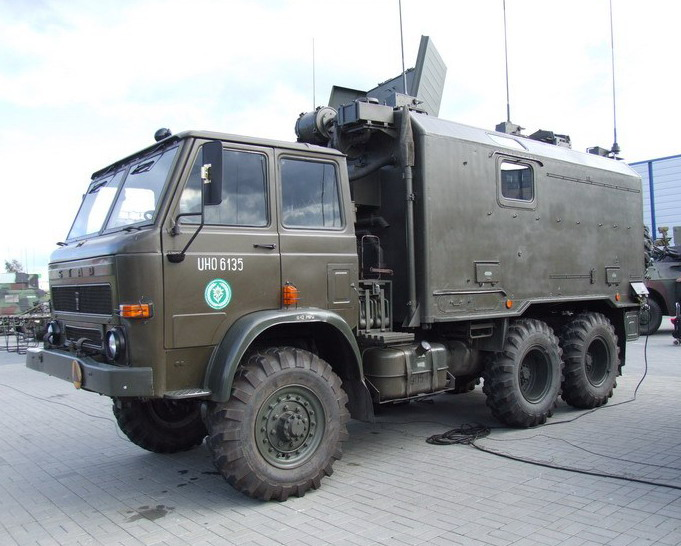
ADK-11 command and staff vehicle with a KUNG shelter of the Polish Land Forces during MSPO 2006.

- Star 266 - standard production model.
  - Star 266M - modernized 266.
  - Star 266 based military truck-mounted crane with 5 tonnes capacity.
  - Star 266 based military excavator.
  - GD-2 - military smokescreen generation vehicle used for creating constant or temporary smokescreens with maximal dimensions of 1500x150 m. Also known as typ 528.
  - CD-5 - military tank truck used for transport of liquid fuel by supply platoons of tank and mechanized battalions. It's equipped with a 4500-liter tank and a pump. Also known as typ 520.
  - Hibneryt - The Hibneryt is a Polish armored radar-directed self-propelled anti-aircraft gun system mounted on the Star 266 chassis.
  - WUS-3 - military special vehicle used for disinfection, deactivation and decontamination of vehicles, terrain, equipment and buildings.
  - IRS (IRS stands for Instalacja Sanitarno-Rozlewcza) - military special vehicle used for disinfection, deactivation and decontamination of vehicles, terrain, equipment and buildings.
  - ADK-11 - military command and staff vehicle used as a part of the Topaz artillery fire direction system.
  - Star-266 AP-64 - military special transport vehicle used for transporting the elements of the PP-64 Wstęga pontoon bridge.
  - Star-266 BP-64 - military special transport vehicle used for transporting riverbank side pontoons of the PP-64 Wstęga pontoon bridge. Has an enlarged cabin with space for up to four soldiers.

== Military operators ==
Current

- Poland: Polish Army – Produced and Used here.
- Angola: Angolan Armed Forces – 2785 (delivered between 1977 and 1981)
- Myanmar: Burmese Armed Forces – 106 (1990)
- Hungary: Hungarian Defence Force – 174 (1986–1989) Given or Sold in terms of Technological exchange.
- Lithuania: Lithuanian Army – some Star 266 were donated by Poland
- Iraq: New Iraqi Army – Status unknown
- Yemen: Military of Yemen – 400 (1999–2000)
- Libya: Libyan Army – 650 (1986)
- Soviet Union: Soviet Army – 394 (1987–1989) Given to USSR by Polish Military in terms of technological exchange.
- RSA: South African Army – captured in Angola
- Ukraine: Ukrainian Ground Forces – donated after the 2022 Russian invasion of Ukraine.

Former

- People's Republic of Angola
- Hungarian People's Republic
- Socialist People's Libyan Arab Jamahiriya
- Polish People's Republic
- (Post-independence Burma (1948–1962)) State Peace and Development Council – (Union of Burma/Myanmar)
- South Africa
