= Star 28/29 =

Star 28 Star 29
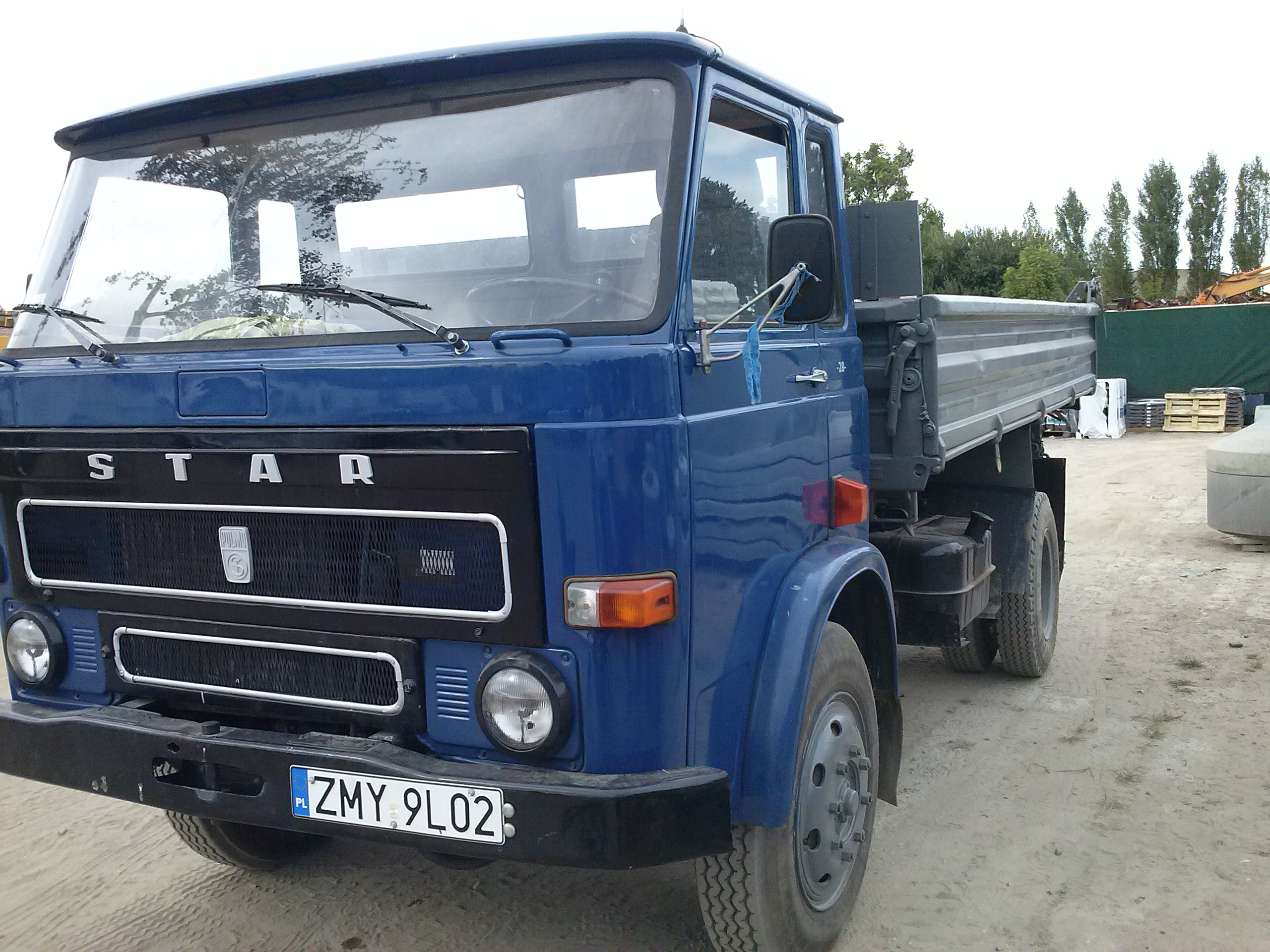

Overview
- Manufacturer: FSC Star
- Production: 1968–1989 (Star 28); 1968–1983 (Star 29)
- Assembly: Poland

Body and chassis
- Class: Truck
- Body style: 2-door standard cab

Powertrain
- Engine: 6,2L S530A V6 (Star 28); 4,6L S47 V6 (Star 29)
- Transmission: 5-speed manual

Dimensions
- Length: 6455 mm
- Width: 2380 mm
- Height: 2330-3000 mm
- Curb weight: 4200 kg

Chronology
- Successor: Star 200

The Star 28 and Star 29 – trucks constituting a transitional design between the previous models (Star 25 and its diesel engine variant - Star 27) and the target model, which was the Star 200. The Star 28 was powered by a diesel engine, while the Star 29 had a petrol engine and was the last model with this type of drive unit produced by the Starachowice factory.

== History ==
The Star 28 and 29 were put into production in 1968. They differed from the Star 200 mainly in their load capacity. Their design used many modernized elements from the Star 25 and 27. The most important ones were: an engine with increased power, a gearbox with reinforced gears and a reinforced rear axle. All other components came from the Star 200 that was being designed and prepared for production. Old structural elements were gradually removed until 100% of the Star 200 parts were achieved, i.e. transformation into a new model.

The main reason for the creation of cars of this series was the prolonged design work on the S359 direct injection diesel engine with 150 HP.

The Star 28/29 has the following engines:

- S530A1 diesel with 100 HP in the Star 28 model,
- S47A petrol with 105 HP in the Star 29 model.

Both models are designed for transport on roads with improved surfaces. The remaining drive units, brake system, and steering system are identical in both cars. The Star 28 and Star 29 cars have a cabin developed in cooperation with the French company Chausson, which provides the driver with relatively comfortable working conditions - anatomical seats with the possibility of adjustment, heating, ventilation, adjustment of the steering wheel position, the possibility of installing a radio and a washbasin, brought the Star 28 and Star 29 cars closer to European standards. In addition to the basic Star 28 and Star 29 models, the following were also produced:

- Star C28 tractor unit,
- Star Ż28 crane chassis or special devices,
- BW 28 tipper chassis,
- special van chassis.

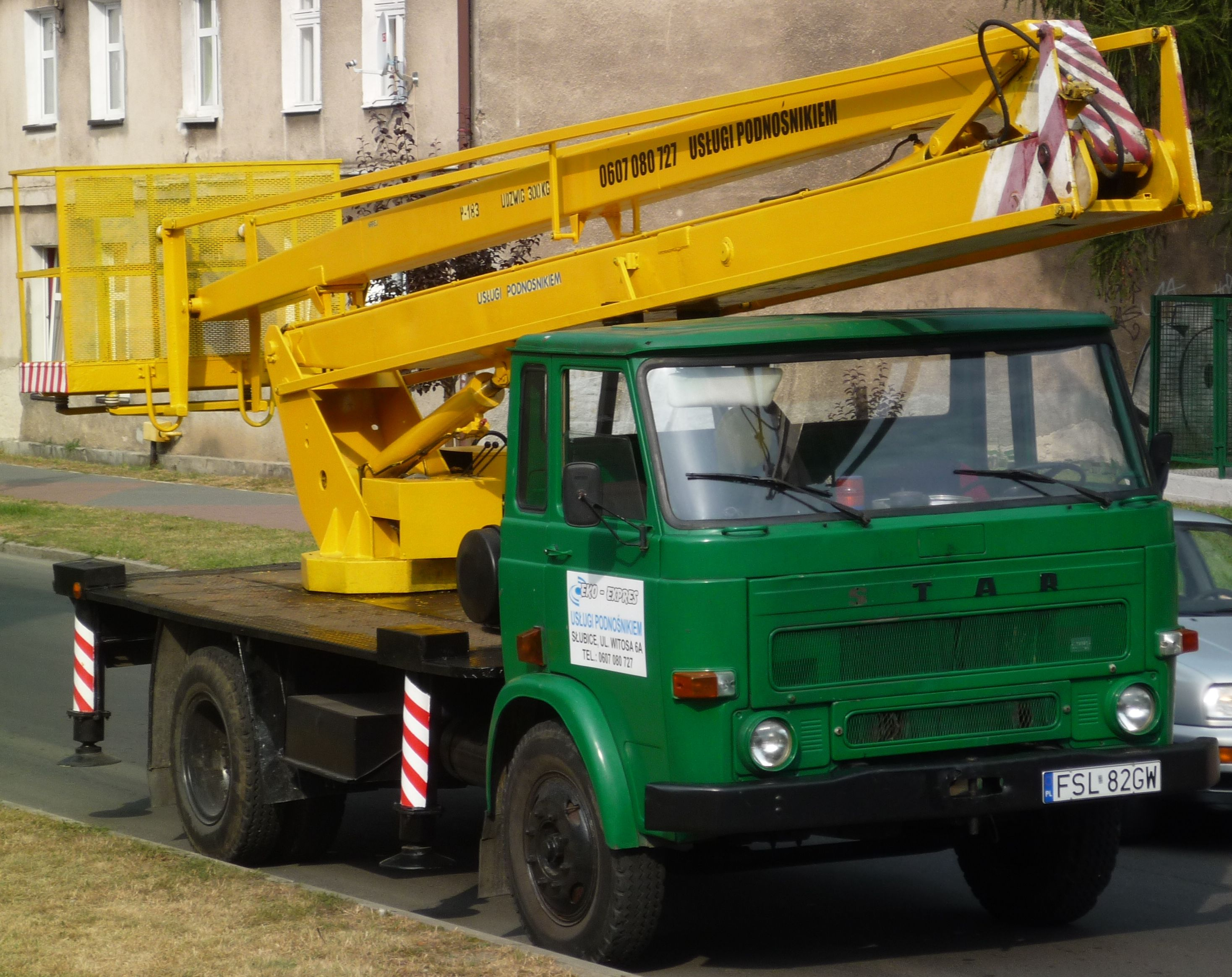
Star 29 bucket truck

The vehicle's disadvantages included the lack of power steering (which made the driver's work tiring - especially during maneuvering), and the use of the clutch and brake required considerable force. An incompletely synchronized gearbox was also used. It should be emphasized, however, that the vast majority of trucks driving on Polish roads at that time had such features.

8,939 Star 29 and 117 Star 28 vehicles were delivered to the Polish People's Army.
