= Waran (armored personnel carrier) =

Polish armored multi-purpose vehicles

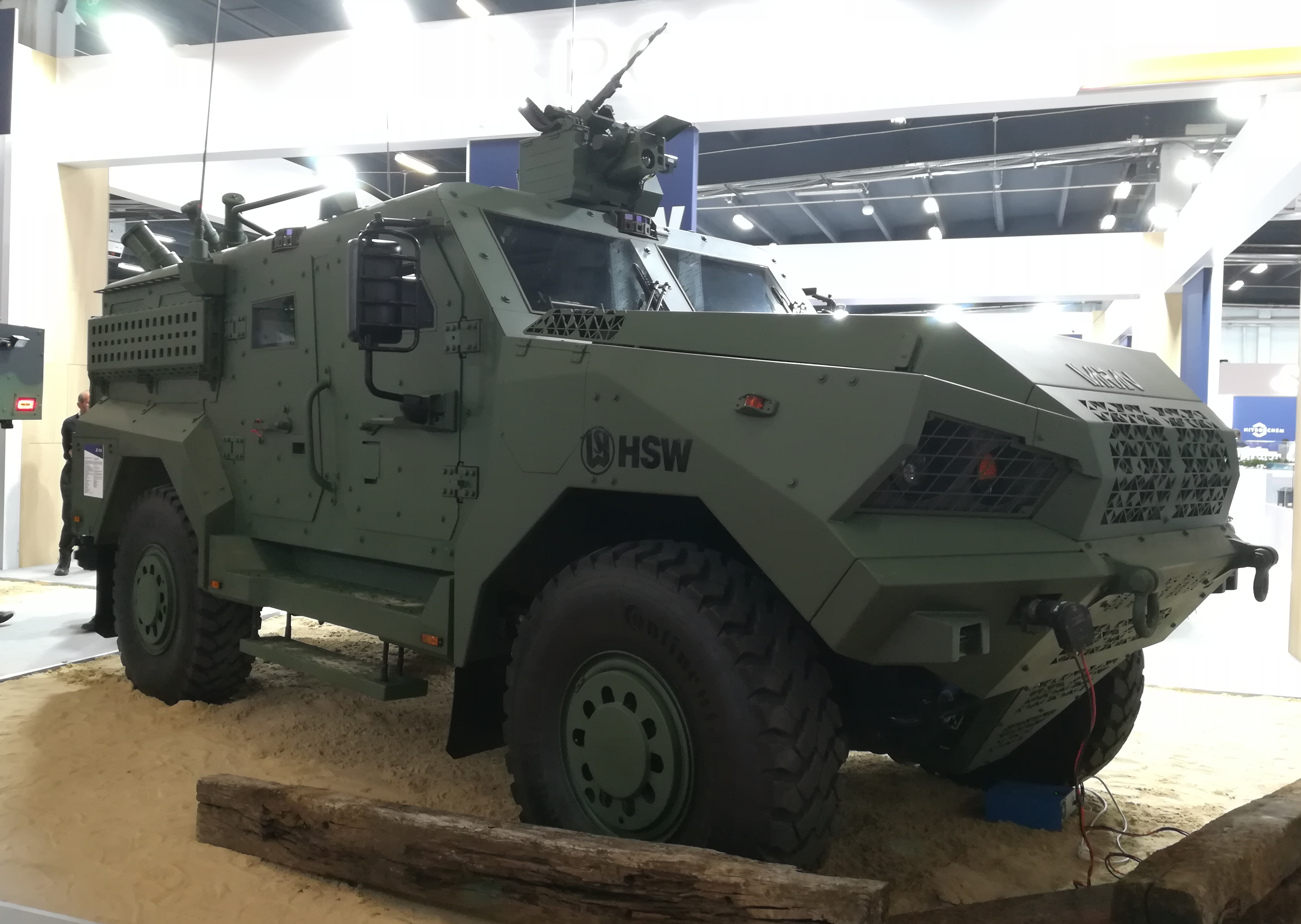
- Waran 4x4 at International Defence Industry Exhibition 2022 in Kielce, Poland.
- Type: Armored personnel carrier
- Place of origin: Poland / Czech Republic

Service history
- Used by: See Operators

Production history
- Designer: Huta Stalowa Wola

Specifications
- Mass: 13000 kg
- Length: 6,20 m
- Width: 2,55 m
- Height: 2,55 m
- Crew: 2 + 6

The Waran is a medium-class wheeled, tactical armored multi-purpose vehicle manufactured by the Polish firm Huta Stalowa Wola.

== Development ==
Under agreement signed on September 8, 2020, during the 18th International Defence Industry Exhibition (MSPO), the vehicle was developed in cooperation with a Czech partner, Tatra Export, which is owned by Czechoslovak Group and Promet Group. In order to enable production in Poland, this deal stipulated the design and delivery of a 4x4 armored vehicle as well as the technical documentation for the cabin. The Czech Patriot II, which was based on the Force line's T815-7M3B21.372 chassis and had previously been unveiled at the 17th MSPO in 2019, served as the foundation for the future Waran vehicle.

However as Huta Stalowa Wola pointed out, Waran underwent significant redesign and modification in Poland to satisfy the demands of the Artillery and Missile Forces. On 8 November 2024, an unknown number were ordered in command vehicle variant along with a number of Heron vehicles, worth approximately PLN 1.3 billion. These vehicles will be delivered in the years 2027-2028.

== Construction ==
Waran is to be manufactured by Huta Stalowa Wola S.A. - Autosan Branch in Sanok. The 4x4 Waran is based on the chassis of the Tatra 815-7 truck, built as a central tubular frame to which all the chassis elements are attached, and inside it there are drive shafts for the front and rear axles. Each wheel is suspended and driven independently, which creates a durable structure with excellent traction properties in difficult terrain conditions and ensures high driving comfort. The length of the vehicle is 6.2 m, width - 2.55 m, and height - 2.55 m, with a wheelbase of 3.65 m. It can move at a maximum speed of up to 110 km/h, and its range is up to 650 km.

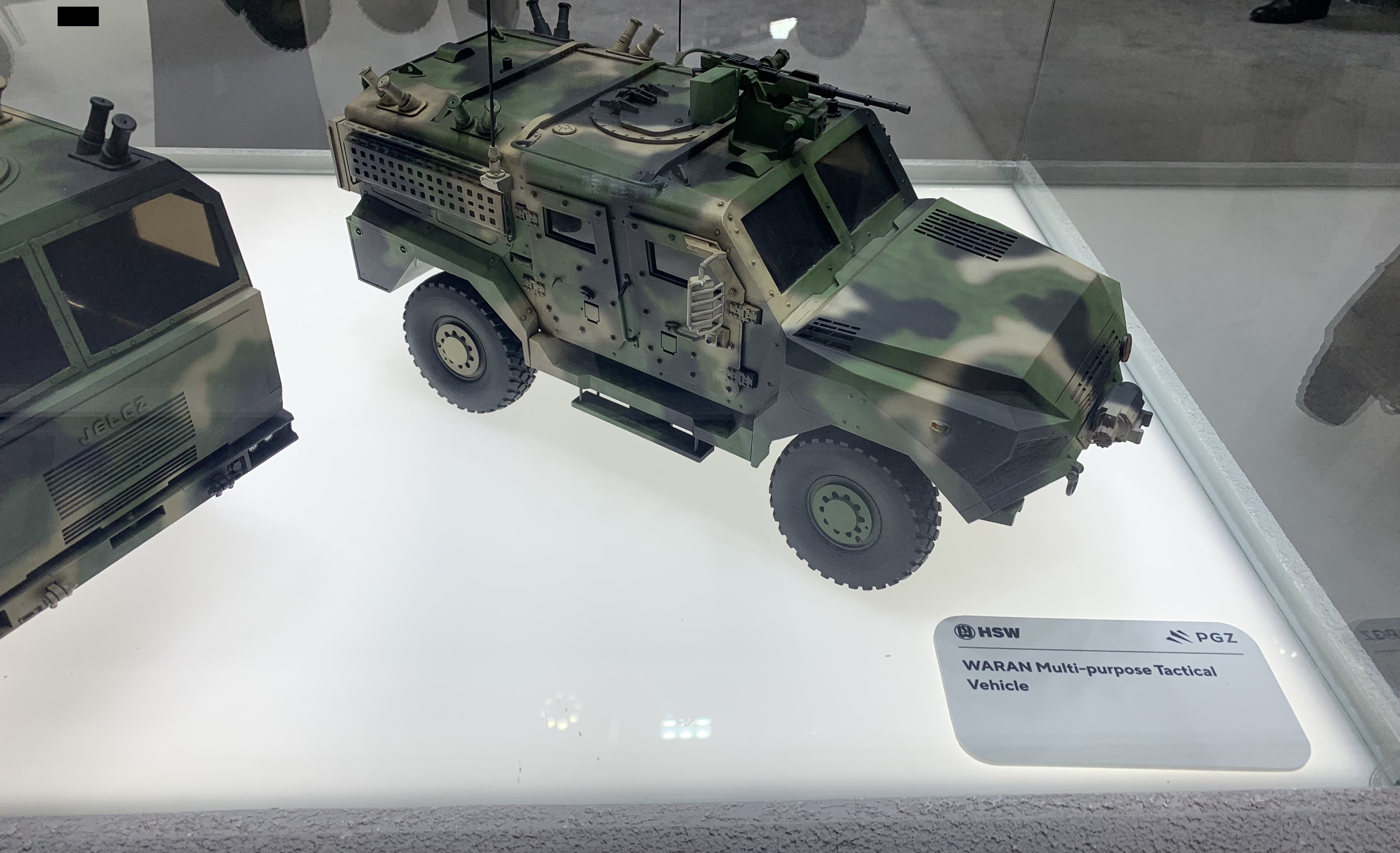
Waran vehicle model present at IDEX 2025 in Abu Dhabi.

The advantage of the chassis is also its modularity, which allows for the reconfiguration of the 4x4 chassis to a 6x6 or 8x8 variant, as well as the creation of different body versions.Undercut bumpers plus adjustable ground clearance from 260 to 430 mm mean that the vehicle can, among other things, overcome fords up to 1.2 m deep, slopes with an inclination of up to 45˚, vertical obstacles 0.5 m high. The approach and departure angles are 45˚, with the vehicle's own weight of 13 tons.

The vehicle is powered by two drive units – a 300 kW air-cooled Tatra T3C-928-90 engine, or a 270 kW liquid-cooled Cummins ISL engine.

The Allison 4500SP automatic transmission is standard for both engines, its performance fully corresponds to the parameters of a vehicle with a combat weight of 18 tons, of which the curb weight is 13 tons - with level 2 ballistic and mine protection according to STANAG 4569. The vehicle can be equipped with additional armor, which corresponds to level 4 according to STANAG 4569, and in mine protection - level 2a / 2b-3a / 3b.

Mine resistance is provided by, among others, the V-shaped chassis bottom to disperse the force of the explosion.

The vehicle in its basic version can carry up to eight soldiers and a wide range of specialist equipment. The vehicle is adapted to operate in difficult climatic conditions, from -32˚C to +49˚C, and provides protection against the effects of weapons of mass destruction. It has an automatic fire protection system for the cabin and engine compartment. It can be integrated with a remotely controlled gunnery station and electronic observation heads.

The vehicle's payload with level 2 ballistic protection (according to STANAG 4569) and 2a/2b, mine protection, is 5 tons[2]. In the basic version, the vehicle has a crew of two, and the ability to transport six armed and fully equipped soldiers

The vehicle can be armed with the Remotely Controlled Weapons Module (ZSMU) A3 with a 7.62 mm UKM 2000 machine gun, integrated with the ZZKO Topaz system with appropriate communication means, as well as with the Obra-3 passive defense system integrated with smoke grenade launchers.

Waran complies with applicable road traffic regulations, so it can be driven on public roads when carrying out crisis operations or during training.

== Purpose ==
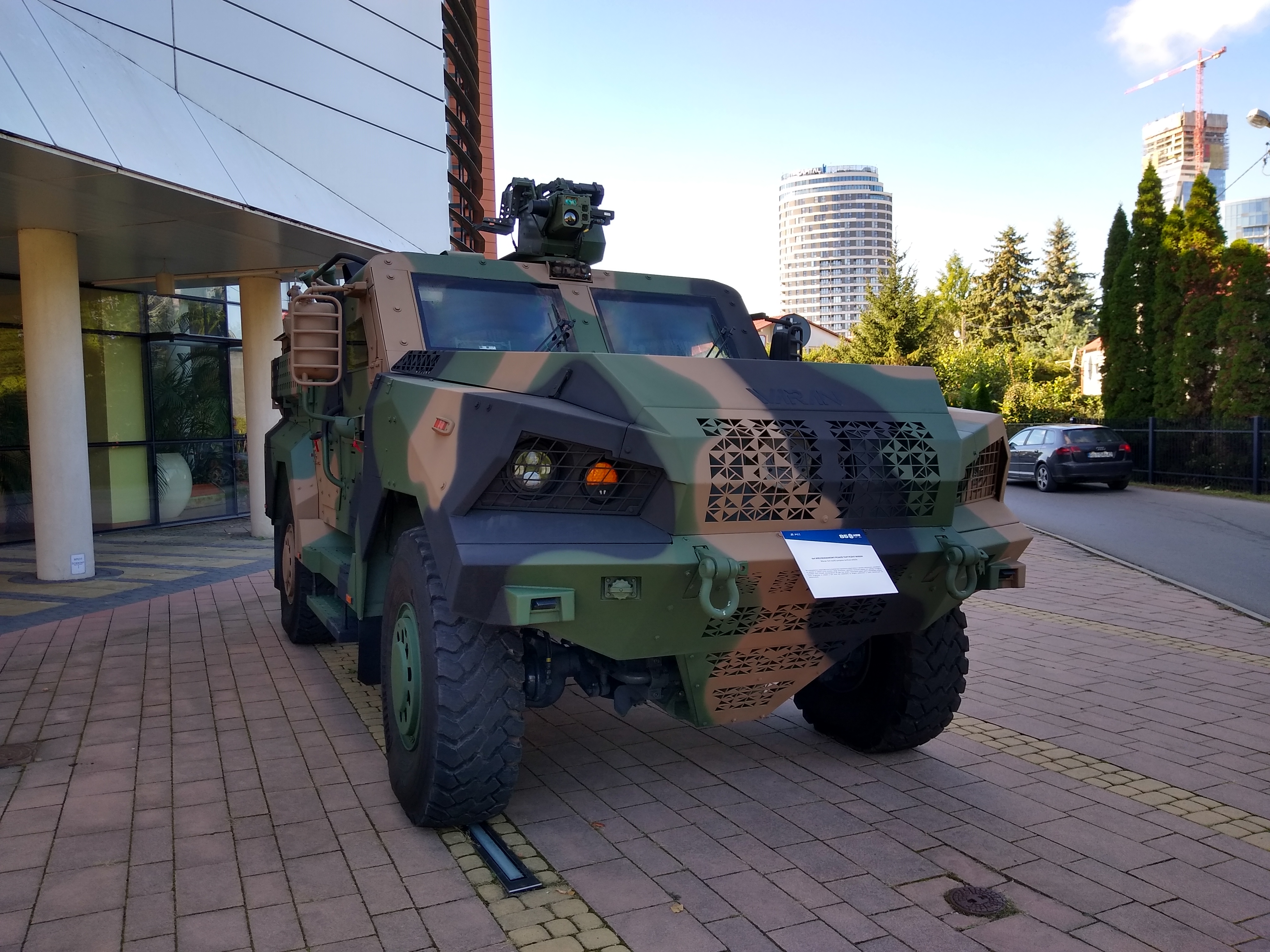
Waran as a reconnaissance vehicle.

The main purpose of the vehicles is to serve as command and reconnaissance vehicles for divisions of self-propelled 152 mm wz. 1977 Dana howitzers and 122 mm WR-40 Langusta rocket launchers, and in the future also AHS Kryl howitzers.

In May 2022, the Ministry of National Defense ordered the Gladius reconnaissance and strike system mounted on the Waran, manufactured by the Polish WB Electronics Group. The system is to include both FT-5 reconnaissance drones and a new type of Gladius 2 search and strike drones with a range of at least 100 km, developed in accordance with the requirements of the Rocket and Artillery Troops. The subject of the contract, worth PLN 2 billion, is the delivery of four battery modules of the Gladius unmanned search and strike systems along with training and logistics packages.

The first specialist variant of the Waran to enter service, however, is a missile tank destroyer. Equipped with Brimstone family anti-tank guided missiles, the vehicle is to be delivered to the army this year. The recipient will be the 14th Suwałki Anti-Tank Artillery Regiment.

The vehicle is also a universal base platform for the development of specialist vehicles for other types of troops, including a proposal for the Special Forces (PEGAZ program)

Waran, equipped with observation optoelectronic heads, is also suitable for the role of a close artillery reconnaissance vehicle. The armoured reconnaissance vehicle from Stalowa Wola would also be suitable for the role of a reconnaissance vehicle for lower-level firing positions in the Narew system – a program for the construction of a future short-range air shield.

== Equipment ==
The equipment of the Waran 4x4 Tactical Multi-Purpose Vehicle offered by HSW includes:

- air conditioning system with filter ventilation system;;
- automatic fire protection system for the cabin and engine compartment;;
- parking heater;
- digital observation system;
- internal and external communication systems;
- observation head with day-night camera, infrared thermal imaging camera;
- central wheel inflation system;
- tires with Run Flat inserts;
- unmanned aerial vehicle for reconnaissance purposes;
- power generator;
- remotely controlled weapon module or turntable;
- OBRA warning and self-protection system, with smoke grenade launcher unit

== Variants ==
As of 10.02.2024, the individual designations of specific versions of the Waran vehicles are not known. However, the presented and planned variants include:

- Armored personnel carrier - basic variant
- Command vehicle - 2 different variants for the Ottokar-Brzoza program., and the drone carrier (Gladius program)
- Unmanned Aerial Vehicle Carrier - Gladius Program
- Tank destroyer (project codename Ottokar-Brzoza)
- Reconnaissance vehicle - for the Ottokar-Brzoza program (under development)
- Anti-drone system - equipped with a 12.7 mm WLKM, presented during MSPO 2023.

== Operators ==
- Poland
