= Skorpion-3 =

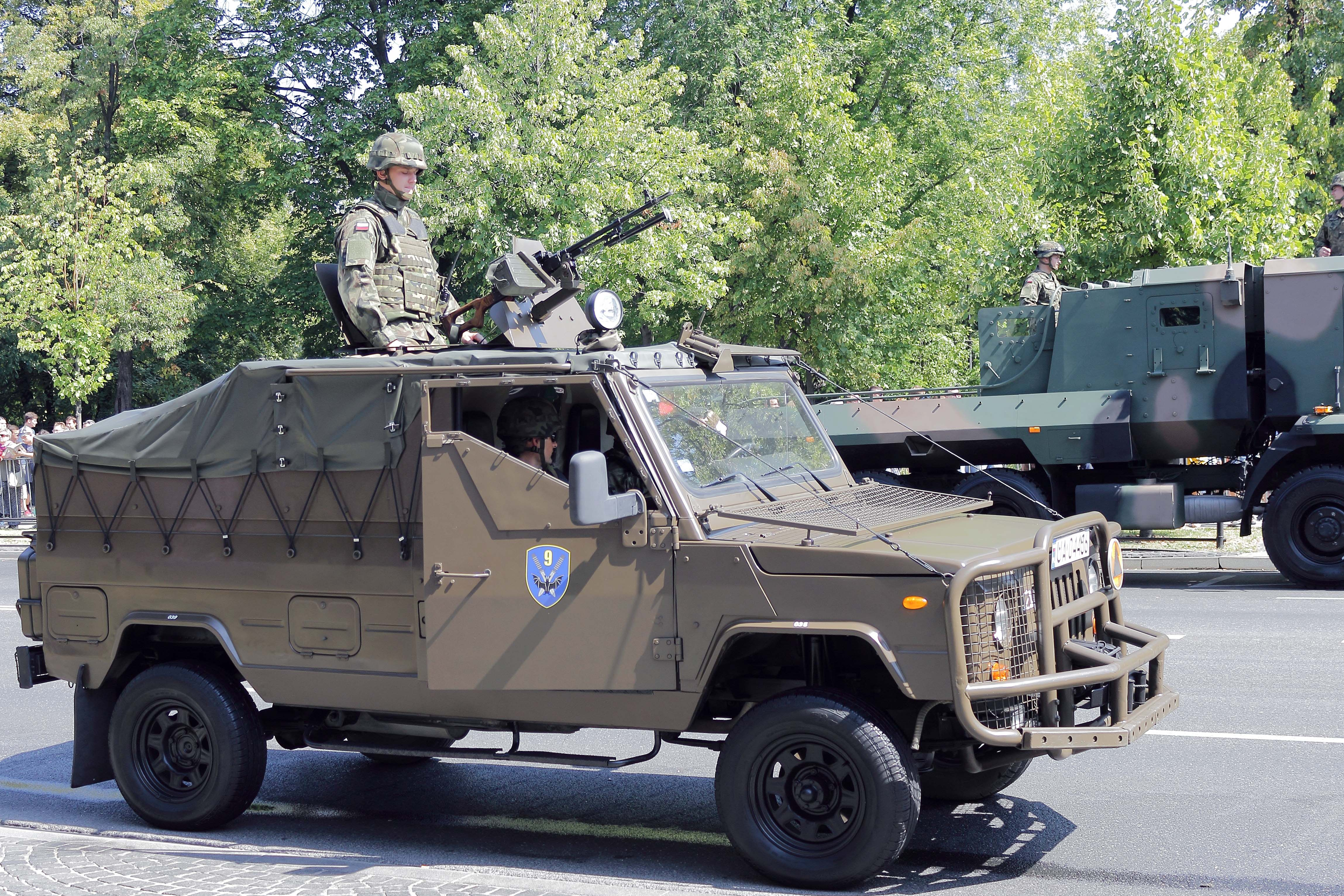
- Skorpion-3 at 2015 military parade in Warsaw
- Type: Multi-purpose off-road vehicle
- Place of origin: Poland

Service history
- Used by: Polish Land Forces

Production history
- Produced: 2004 – ?
- No. built: 80

Specifications
- Mass: 2600 kg
- Crew: 1-5

The Honker Skorpion-3 is a Polish multi-purpose off-road vehicle. It is a modified version of the Honker developed as a result of the experience of soldiers from the first rotations of the Polish contingent in Iraq. It was developed by the 4th District Technical Workshops in Żurawica in 2003. It is set to be replaced by the LPU Wirus 4.

== Development ==
In 2003, along with the mission in Iraq, it turned out that there was a great need to introduce a light armored vehicle adapted to conduct patrol operations. The only armored vehicles that the contingent had at its disposal were modernized BRDM-2 scout cars. Unarmored vehicles such as the Honker and the Star 944 were used to transport soldiers. In order to provide at least temporary protection against shrapnel, soldiers improvised and armored themselves with various materials including sandbags, sheet metal, and elements from wreckage. Often such makeshift armor was not effective, and instead excessively burdened the vehicle's structure.

In light of such actions, it was decided to armour the Honker. In 2003, the 1st District Technical Workshops in Grudziądz developed a modernisation package for the Honker vehicle. The package included a base with a recoil compensator for the PK/PKM machine gun and additional steel covers. They were intended for installation in doors, on the sides, and on the machine gun rotator.

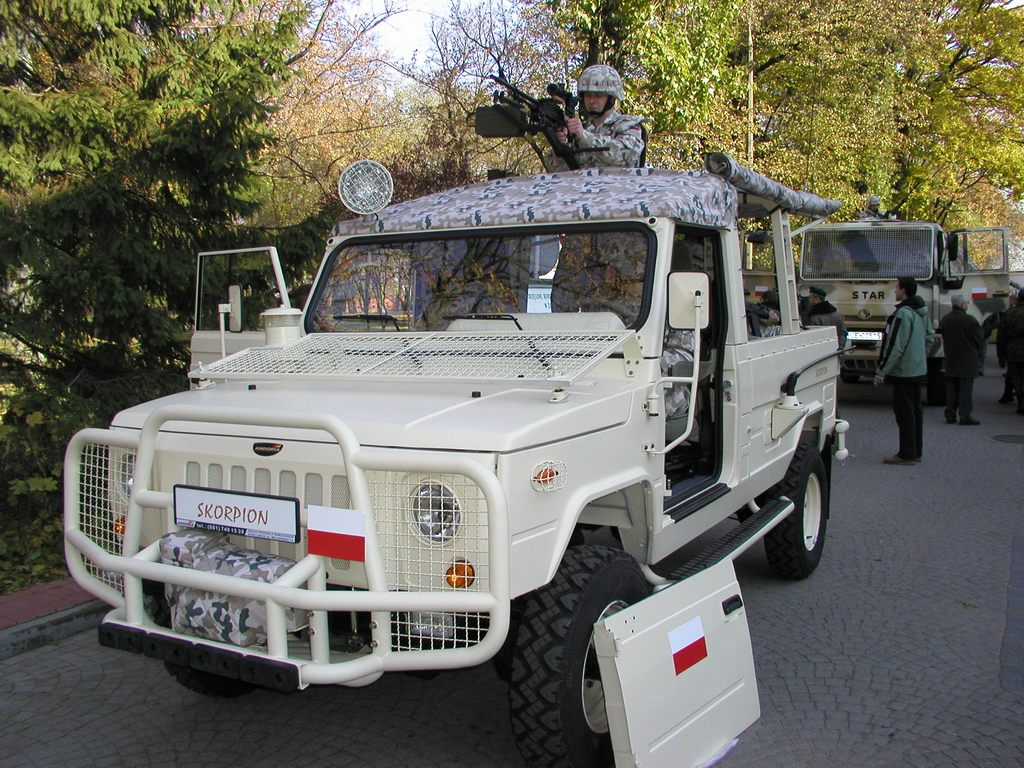
Honker Skorpion

Honker Skorpion-3 in Iraq

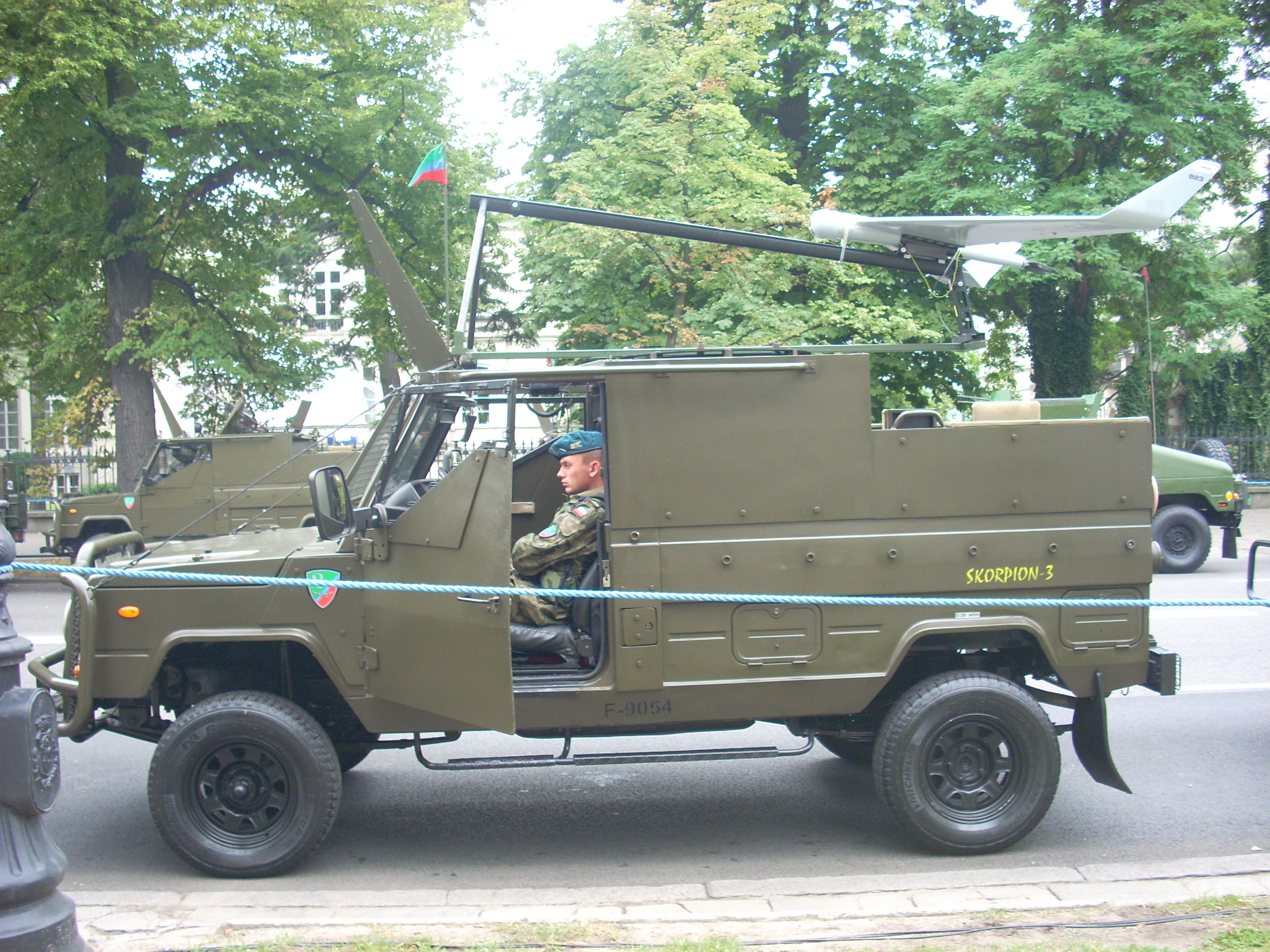
Skorpion-3 with UAV mounted on it

The modernization packages were only a temporary solution. A fully-fledged armored vehicle had to be introduced, to the extent that it would protect the crew and passengers from small arms fire and IED explosions. In October 2003, during a press presentation at the Land Forces Command, prototypes of three vehicles intended for the mission in Iraq were presented: the BRDM-2M96ik "Szakal", the Star 944 "Hyena" as well as Honker Skorpion.

The "Scorpion" prototype was a light vehicle designed for patrolling. The vehicle had a crew of 5 soldiers: driver, commander, machine gunner and two patrol soldiers. The benches for the patrol soldiers were placed so that they sat back to back. Changes compared to the Honker included: a new roof frame with a turntable, new benches, new lighter doors (with the possibility of quick disassembly) and a more massive front bumper (designed for ramming gates). The vehicle was protected against mine explosions by lining the floor with LIM-3 anti-splinter lining. In addition, some chassis elements received additional shields, e.g. shock absorbers. The windscreen was reinforced with an applied mesh.

Prototype vehicles were sent to Iraq for testing. The "Jackal" and "Hyena" were assessed positively, while the "Scorpion" received critical reviews. Among other things, they were criticized for the lack of armor (although the chassis's resistance to mines was improved), and the small size of the turntable's diameter (it did not fit a person in a bulletproof vest and tactical equipment).

=== LOSOT-2 ===
The first Honker modifications were: Ryś and LOSOT (Lightly Armored Passenger vehicle - Off-Road), however, they did not become widely used.

The vehicle, modernized based on the soldiers' comments, was presented at the MSPO 2004 exhibition, alongside other Honker modifications. The Skorpion modernization was presented under the name LOSOT-2, it was a combination of solutions from the LOSOT and Skorpion prototypes.

LOSOT-2 from 4 OTW from Żurawica is in practice a Skorpion vehicle with added armor and several improvements. Compared to the first version of Skorpion, the following changes were introduced: the "back-to-back" benches for patrol soldiers were abandoned (instead, folding chairs attached to the sides), a thinner LIM-3 carpet was used (10 instead of 15 mm), additional chassis covers were removed and new armor was introduced.

The armouring consisted of new side doors (made of armoured steel with a thickness of approx. 6 mm) with mesh in place of windows, mesh covers attached to the body in front of and behind the doors, slanted armour plates on the sides and composite covers for the upper part of the sides.

In addition, the turntable was improved: it was equipped with a small armored shield and its diameter was increased, and a knife for cutting ropes was mounted on the roof. A spare wheel was placed inside the vehicle.

== Skorpion-3 ==
The final version of the vehicle intended for serial production was designated Skorpion-3. The following changes were introduced in comparison to LOSOT-2: the height of the frame was reduced, the upper side covers were made of steel instead of composite, the winch was eliminated, the folding seats were modified (so that it was possible to sit astride them), a modified KD-150 turntable from Star truck was used, and a new RRC-9500 radio station powered by a battery was used.

== Operators ==
- Poland

80 of Skorpion-3 were used by Polish contingent in Iraq. In addition, in September 2006, a dozen or so unarmoured vehicles of this type were handed over to the Iraqi side. These vehicles were heavily used, so before being handed over, they were overhauled by the MND CS repair platoon. The vehicles were delivered to Iraqi gendarmerie units.

- Iraq

10 of Skorpion-3 were donated by Poland to Army's 8th Division.

== See also ==
- Tarpan Honker
- PWA Aero
- LPU Wirus 4

== Bibliography ==
- Fuglewicz, Stefan. "Pancerze dla Iraku". Nowa Technika Wojskowa. 9/2004. Warszawa: Magnum-X Sp. z o.o.: 26–28. ISSN 1230-1655.
- Fuglewicz, Stefan. "O Iraku w Kielcach". Nowa Technika Wojskowa. 10/2004. Warszawa: Magnum-X Sp. z o.o.: 24–29. ISSN 1230-1655.
