= LPU Wirus 4 =

Polish light strike vehicle

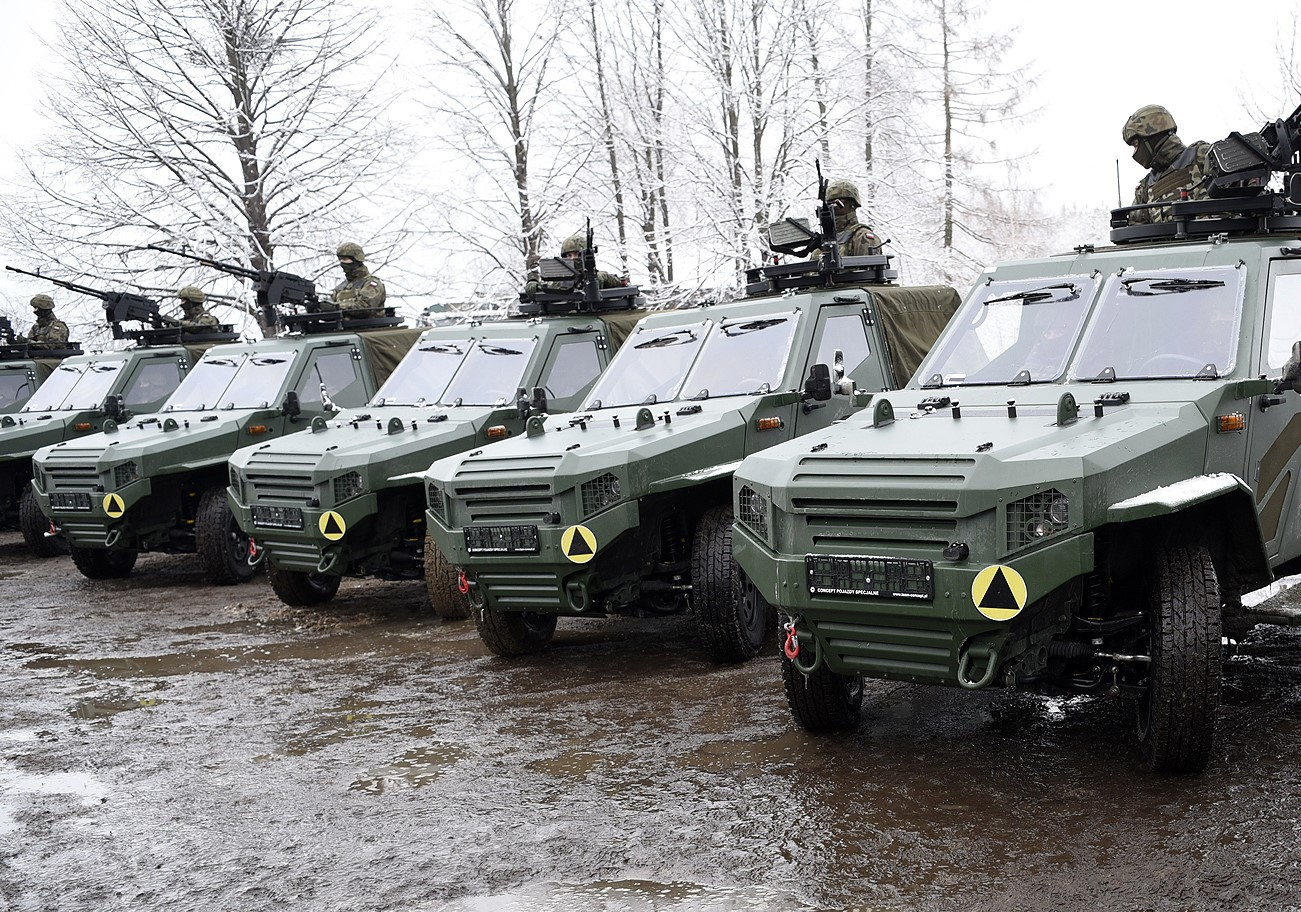
- Transfer of LPU Wirus 4 to the Polish Land Forces
- Type: Reconnaissance vehicle
- Place of origin: Poland

Service history
- In service: 2021 – present
- Used by: See Operators

Production history
- Designer: Concept / Polski Holding Obronny
- Designed: ?
- Manufacturer: Concept / Polski Holding Obronny
- Unit cost: ?
- Produced: 2017 – present
- No. built: 118
- Variants: Reconnaissance vehicle

Specifications
- Mass: 1700 kg
- Length: 4 m
- Width: 2 m
- Height: 2 m
- Crew: 3 (driver + gunner)
- Passengers: 3
- Armour: STANAG 4569 Level 1
- Main armament: UKM-2000 or WLKM 12.7 mm (depending on the version)
- Engine: Diesel engine 180 HP
- Suspension: 4×4 wheel drive
- Operational range: 1,200 km (750 mi)
- Maximum speed: 140 km/h (87 mph)

LPU Wirus 4 (Lekki Pojazd Uderzeniowy Wirus 4, Light Strike Vehicle Virus 4) is a Light Strike Vehicle, currently used in the Polish Armed Forces and developed by Concept and Polski Holding Obronny. The vehicle can be used in long-range reconnaissance missions and fast strikes.

== Development ==
LPU Wirus 4 is the new light vehicle with high mobility designed and manufactured by Concept. It is the fourth in the Wirus series of armoured vehicles. Together with LPU Wirus 2 and LPU Wirus 3, it is a direct development of the LPU-1 Wirus vehicle, which is Concept's response to the Long-range Reconnaissance Vehicles programme codenamed "Żmija". The production-ready prototype of the Wirus 4 vehicle was presented at the MSPO defence fair in Kielce in September 2017. The Wirus 4 vehicle also became the winner of the "Żmija" programme, and in 2017 at the Kielce fair, a contract was signed for the delivery of these vehicles to the Polish Army. The vehicle was also presented at the international defense and security exhibition Eurosatory, which took place in Paris in June 2018.

The vehicle uses a central differential mechanism, and it is possible to select permanent drivers of both axles while driving in various road conditions. From the mass-produced vehicles from the LPU Wirus family (first, second and third generation), the Wirus 4 uses the supporting frame, drive system, reduction gear, front axle, and rear axle. In contrast, many elements and systems have been completely redesigned, among others, a safety cage, adjustable rear suspension, a new electrical system, a body (including the floor, and rear part construction) made of carbon composites, new side and rear doors and bucket seats for the crew with 5-point seat belts. Additionally, it was decided to use a new chassis.

== Description ==
The LPU Wirus 4 is based on a modified Mitsubishi L200 chassis. Its hull comprises high-strength chrome-molybdenum steel pipe and composite laminate connectors. The vehicle uses a 2.4-litre diesel engine with 180 HP and a maximum torque of 430 Nm. The drive unit is connected to a 6-speed manual gearbox and a transfer-reduction gearbox with a locking inter-axle differential, implementing one of four operating modes: 4×2, 4×4, 4×4 locked and 4×4 with a reduced ratio. The vehicle's performance, by the requirements, is: 140 km/h on a paved road and 100 km/h on a dirt road. The vehicle's crew consists of 3 people - the driver, commander and weapons operator. The curb weight of the Żmij is (without weapons) 1700 kg, the payload is 900 kg, and the permissible gross vehicle weight is 2600 kg.

The vehicle has floor armouring at level I according to STANAG 4569 and run-flat inserts in the tires, allowing movement with shot or punctured tires. Wirus 4 also has a radio communication system with a range of 150 km and an electric winch with a rope outlet to the front and rear. The vehicle's configuration options allow for maintaining the autonomy of conducted reconnaissance operations for at least 7 days and the installation of various weapons.

== Variants ==
- LPU Wirus 4 – 3-person basic variant, light attack vehicle for special forces and long-range reconnaissance. Ordered for the Armed Forces.
- LPU Wirus 4 SOF – a variant of the basic version of the LPU Wirus 4 modified to meet the needs of special forces. The vehicle has a 4-person partially built-up cabin, a winch, bases for mounting the ROSY smoke grenade protection system, mounts for UKM 7.62 mm or 5.56 mm weapons, a 360-degree turntable with mounting for WLKM 12,7 mm or UKM 7.62 mm and the possibility of mounting a communication system.

== Operators ==
Current Operators

- Poland (118)
- 118 LPU Wirus 4 vehicles were set to be delivered in 2020–2022.

Deliveries:

- The first 25 vehicles were delivered to the Armed Forces on December 7, 2021.
- Second batch of 35 vehicles were delivered on 20th July 2023.
- Third and last batch of 58 vehicles were delivered in 2024.

== See also ==
- AMZ Bóbr-3
