= WLR-100 Liwiec =

WLR 100 Liwiec
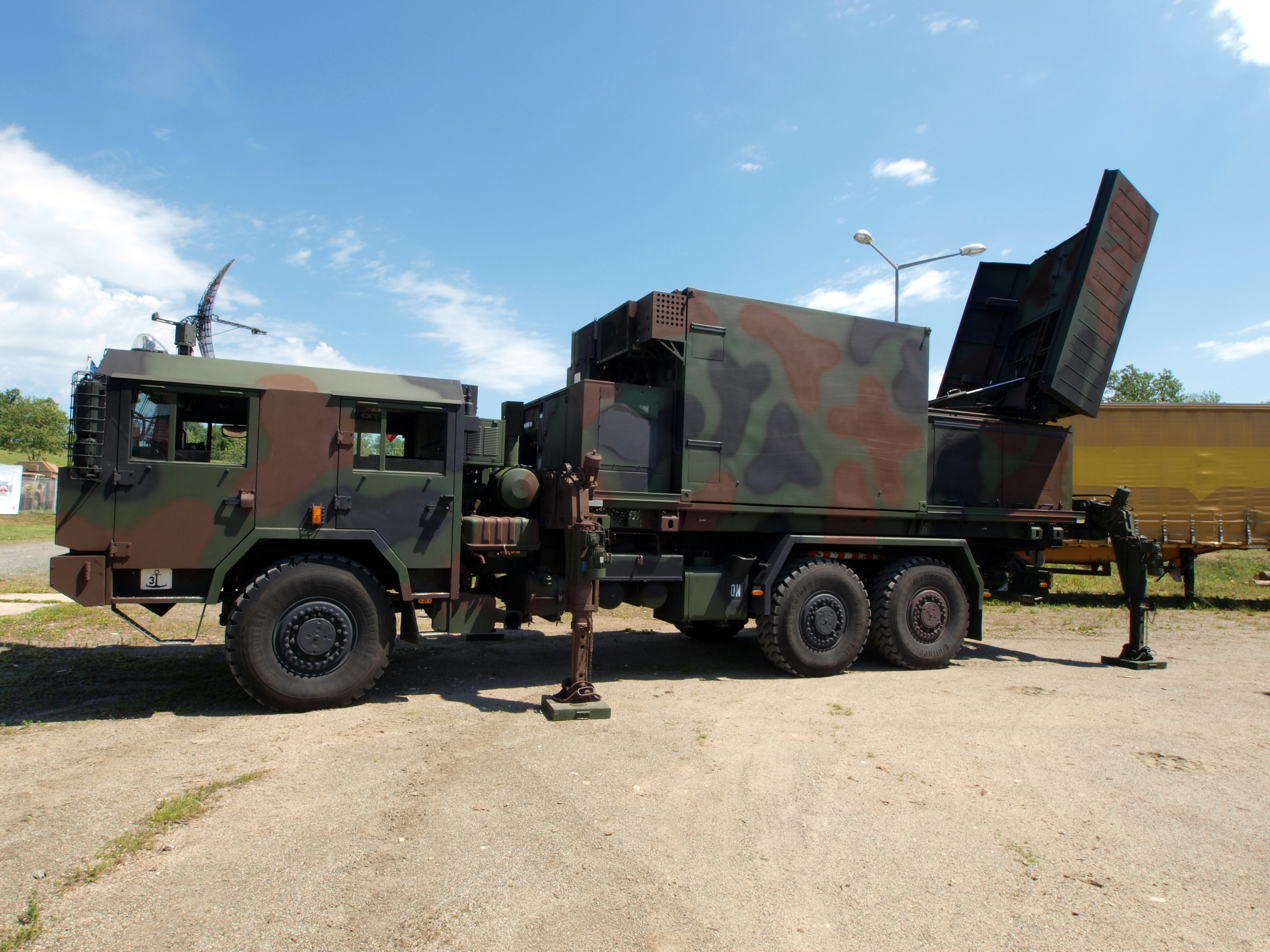
- Country of origin: Poland
- Manufacturer: PIT-Radwar S.A
- Introduced: 2009
- No. built: 10
- Type: Artillery support radar
- Frequency: 20/40/80 km

WLR-100 Liwiec – Radar Artillery Reconnaissance Set manufactured by PIT-Radwar S.A., installed on the Jelcz P.662D.43 chassis. It allows to detect enemy barrel and rocket artillery positions and to correct the fire of own fire assets.

== Development ==
The prototype was designed and manufactured in 2002–2006. It was built on a four-axle Jelcz 862 chassis. In 2007, at the MSPO in Kielce, it was awarded the Defender prize. Three sets from the trial batch were delivered to the Polish Armed Forces in 2009-2010. On January 21, 2013, a contract worth PLN 17.5 million was signed for the delivery of seven serial units. Deliveries completed in 2018. The serial radars are based on the Jelcz P.662D.43 6×6 chassis.

== Specifications ==
- Coordinate positioning accuracy:
  - firing positions: less than 1% of the distance
  - bullet drop points: below: 1% of distance
- Electromagnetic Compatibility: EMI/EMC MIL-STD-461E
- Environmental resistance: MIL-STD-810E
- Unfold/fold time: single minutes
- Crew: 3 people

== Orders ==
Three sets from the trial batch were delivered to the Armed Forces in 2009-2010, while seven series sets were delivered in 2017-2018. There are three of them in each of the three artillery regiments, and the tenth is used at the Artillery and Armament Training Center named after General Józef Bem in Toruń.

In 2010–2012, one set was deployed to Afghanistan at a Polish base in Ghazni Province.

== Operators ==
- Poland – 10

== Gallery ==
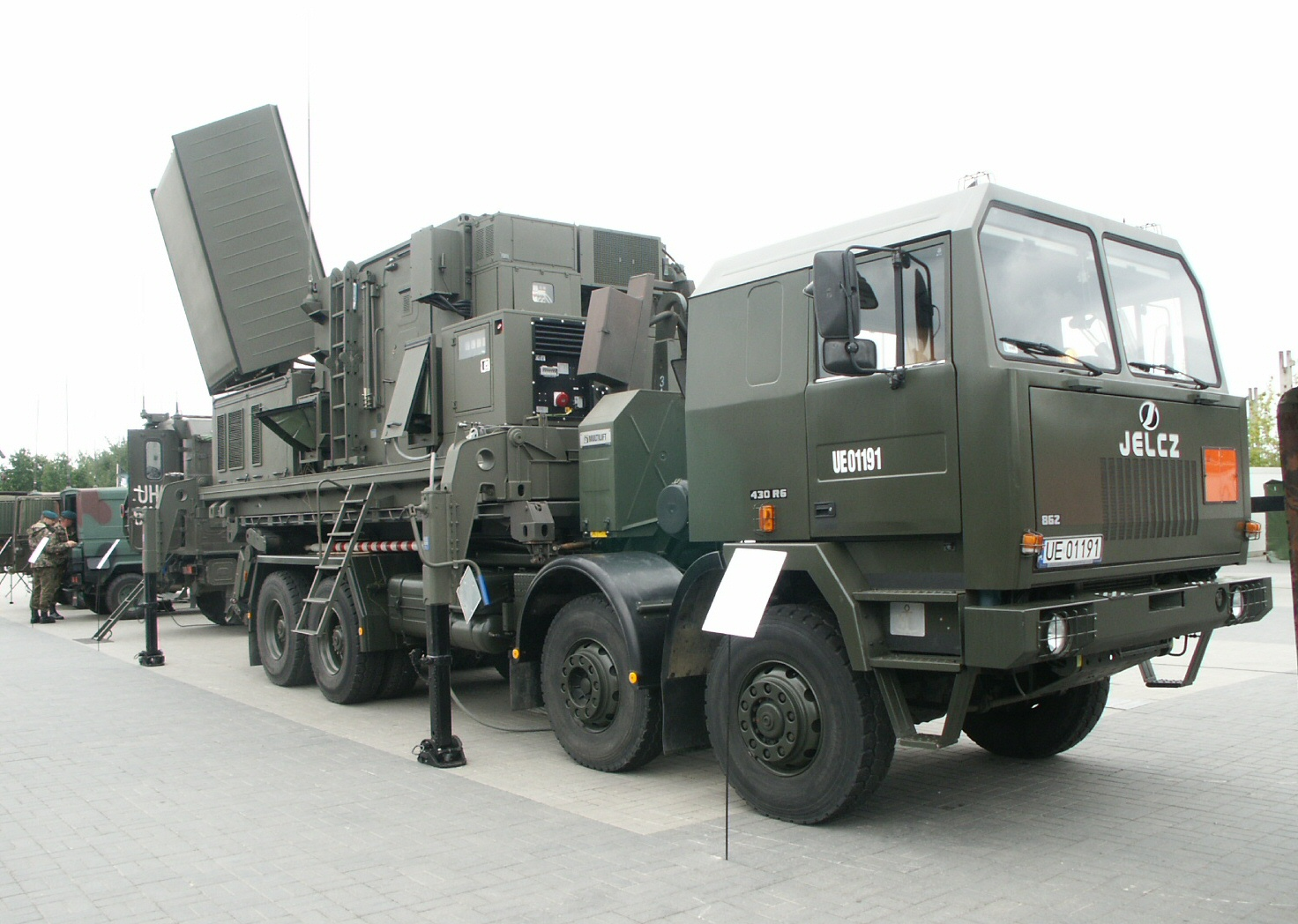
WLR-100 Liwiec Prototype at MSPO 2006

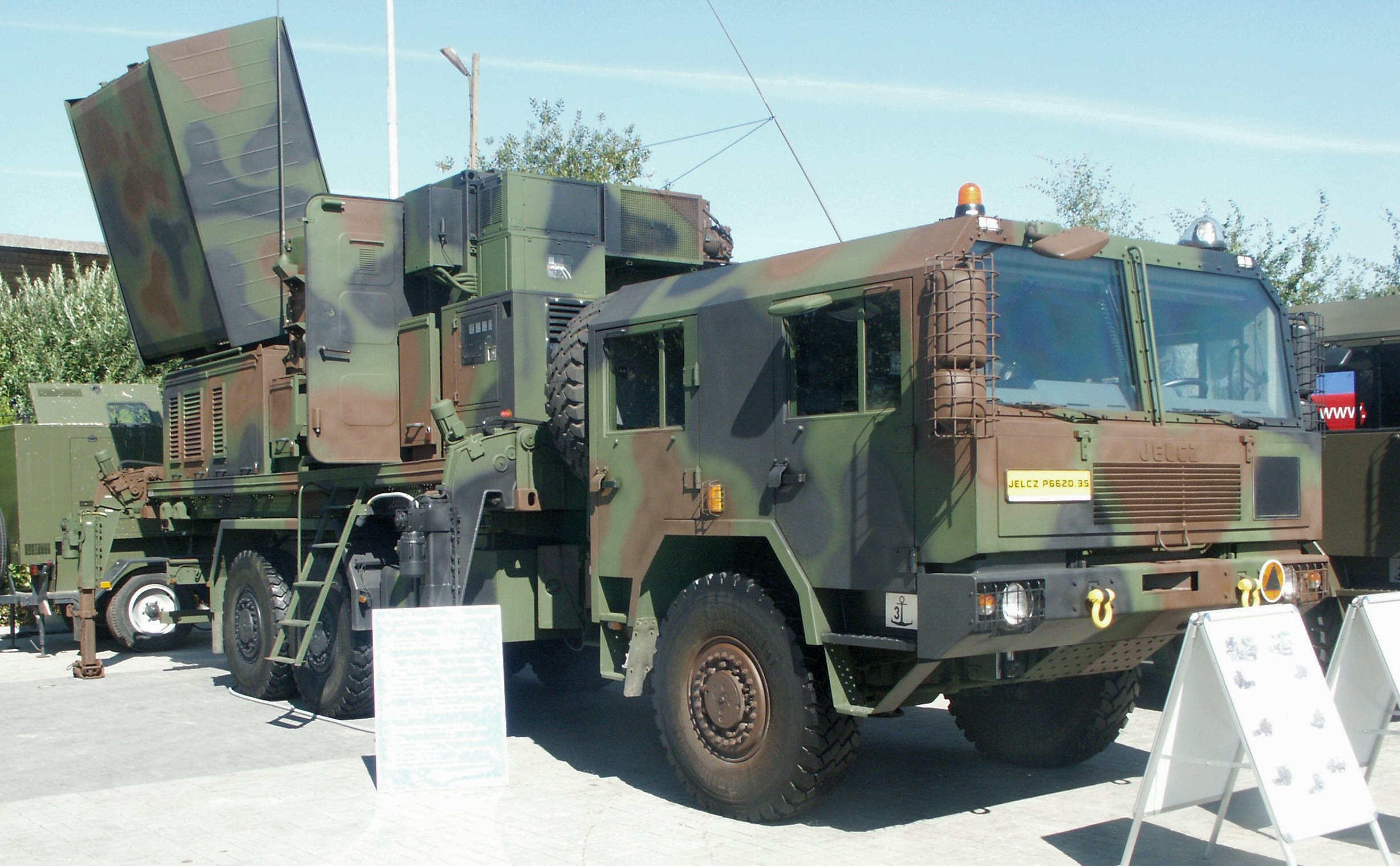
Radar of the trial batch on Jelcz P662D.35

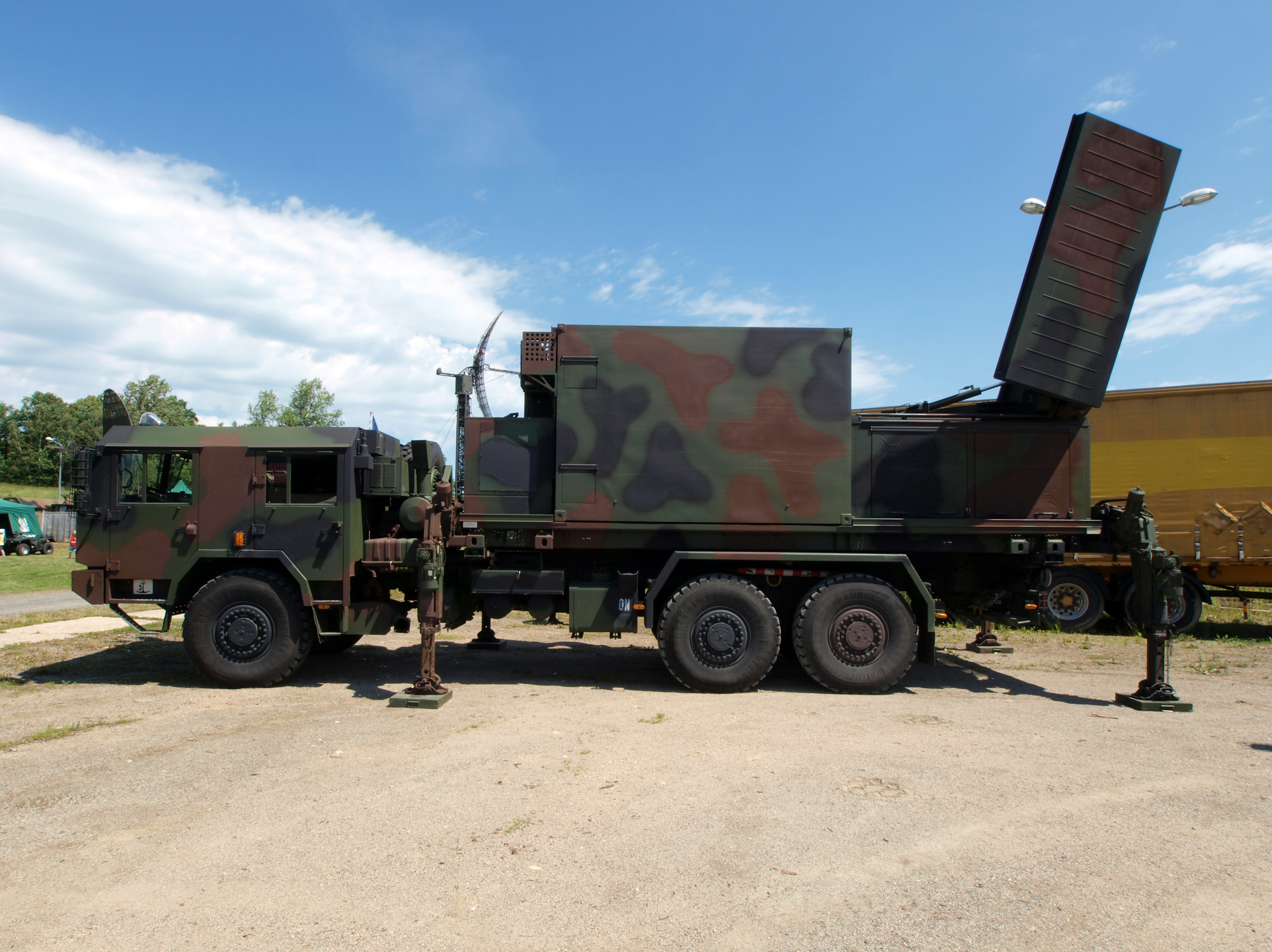
View from behind
