= Zakłady Mechaniczne Tarnów =

Polish defense industry manufacturer

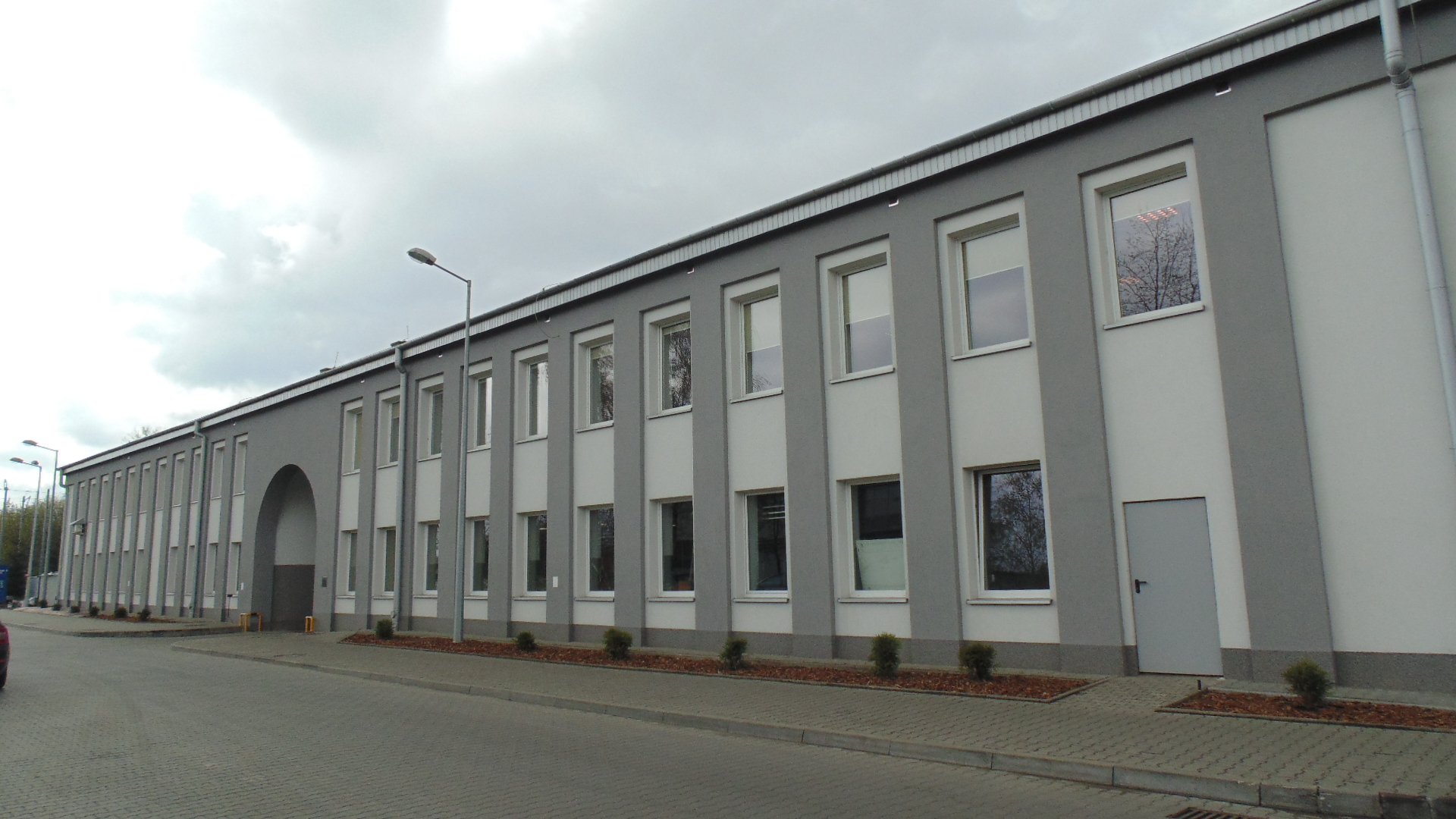
- Industry: Defense
- Founded: 1917; 109 years ago
- Headquarters: 33-100 Tarnów ul. Jana Kochanowskiego 30, Lesser Poland Voivodeship, Poland
- Key people: Robert Sadowski (President of the Management Board)
- Products: Machine guns, sniper rifles, grenade launchers, mortars, remote weapon stations, air-defense systems
- Website: www.zmt.tarnow.pl

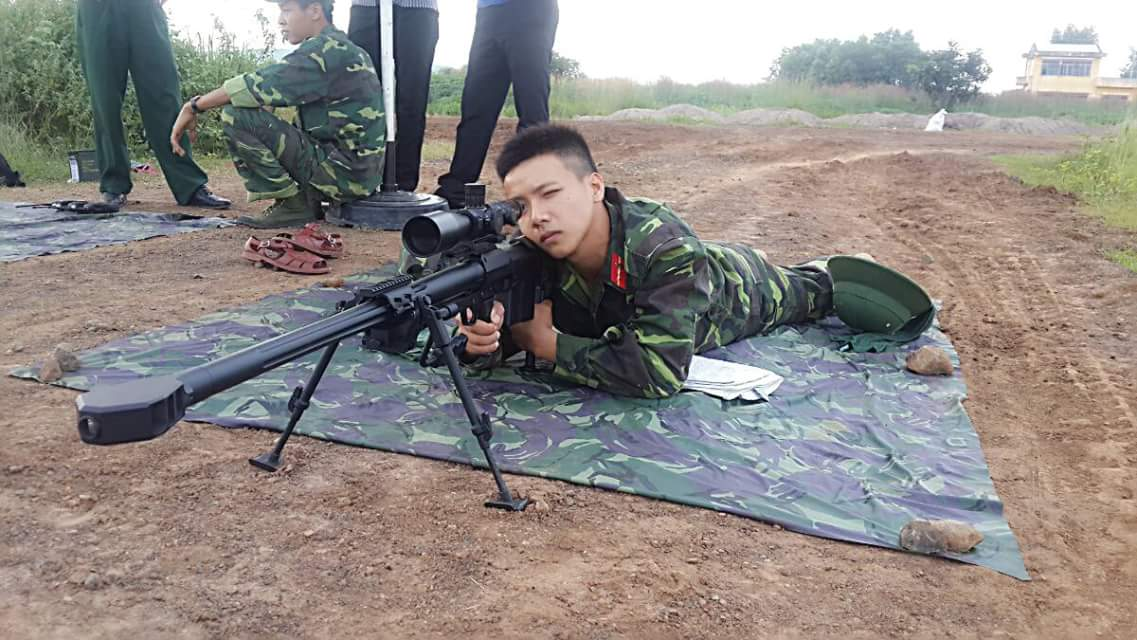
A Vietnamese soldier using a WKW Wilk sniper rifle designed and manufactured by Zakłady Mechaniczne Tarnów

Zakłady Mechaniczne Tarnów (English: Tarnów Mechanical Works; [zakˈwadɨ mɛxaˈnit͡ʂnɛ ˈtarnuv]) is a Polish defense manufacturer based in Tarnów, Poland. The company manufactures small arms, including machine guns and sniper rifles, as well as grenade launchers, mortars, remote weapon stations, air-defense weapon systems and military training equipment. It is part of the Polish Armaments Group (PGZ) capital group.

== History ==
=== Railway workshops (1914–1945) ===
The origins of the company date to World War I. Preparations to establish railway rolling-stock repair workshops in Tarnów began in 1914, when the city was an important railway junction in Galicia and its rail infrastructure had acquired additional importance because of military traffic. The workshops began operating in 1917, initially repairing freight and passenger railway cars.

After Poland regained independence in 1918, the workshops became part of the Polish State Railways (PKP) and were gradually expanded. Employment increased from about 50 workers in 1917 to approximately 1,000 in 1923 and 1,200 in 1928; following the Great Depression, employment stabilised at around 800. The facility developed into one of Tarnów's major industrial plants and, before the outbreak of World War II, was the city's second-largest industrial enterprise after the State Factory of Nitrogen Compounds.

During the German occupation of Poland, the railway works continued to repair rolling stock and were expanded to meet wartime requirements. Employment rose to about 4,500 workers. As the Eastern Front approached Tarnów in 1944, the German authorities dismantled and removed the plant's machinery and equipment to Germany; equipment and facilities that could not be evacuated were destroyed.

=== Post-war period and Warsaw Pact years ===
After World War II, the railway works were rebuilt. By the end of the 1940s, the enterprise, then operating as Railway Locomotive and Carriage Repair Works No. 4, employed approximately 2,500 people. On 1 July 1951, under an agreement between the Ministry of Railways and the Ministry of Heavy Industry, the plant was transferred to the latter ministry and renamed Zakłady Mechaniczne Tarnów. Preparations for military production began later that year, with weapons production starting in 1952.

The first military product manufactured under licence in Tarnów was the Soviet 37 mm M1939 (61-K) anti-aircraft gun, together with the AZP-37-1 sight. Production of the 37 mm NR-37D aircraft cannon was also launched in 1952. The cannon was used on Soviet-designed jet fighters manufactured in Poland, including the MiG-15/Lim-1, MiG-15bis/Lim-2 and variants of the MiG-17.

Military production reached its first peak between 1952 and 1964. Following a decline in military orders in the second half of the 1950s, the company diversified into machine tools and other civilian products. Military production subsequently increased again and included 57 mm S-60 anti-aircraft guns, chassis and components for mortars and radar equipment, and KPVT heavy machine guns for SKOT armoured personnel carriers. In the mid-1960s military orders declined again and the company increasingly concentrated on machine tools and refrigeration equipment.

The plant came under the supervision of the Ponar Machine Tool and Tool Industry Association. For part of the 1970s and early 1980s it operated under the name Fabryka Obrabiarek Specjalizowanych Ponar-Tarnów (Ponar-Tarnów Specialised Machine Tool Factory). Alongside military production, the company manufactured lathes, grinders, electrical discharge machines and industrial refrigeration equipment. At its peak in 1973–1974 the Tarnów works employed approximately 6,500 people.

In 1971, the Ośrodek Badawczo-Rozwojowy Sprzętu Mechanicznego (OBRSM; Research and Development Centre for Mechanical Equipment) was established in Tarnów to develop and modernise military equipment, particularly anti-aircraft weapon systems. The centre cooperated with military research institutes and technical universities and subsequently developed a number of Polish modifications and original weapon systems.

In 1972, production began of the ZU-23-2 twin 23 mm anti-aircraft gun and the 12.7 mm DShKM heavy machine gun. ZMT also manufactured indigenous developments, including the wz. 67 and improved wz. 73 23 mm sub-calibre training barrels for the 100 mm guns of T-55 tanks. During the 1970s OBRSM adapted the ZU-23-2 for naval use. The resulting ZU-23-2M Wróbel twin 23 mm naval gun entered service at the end of the decade.

At the end of the 1970s, the company began production of the 12.7 mm NSV heavy machine gun and its tank mounting. The final Soviet-licensed products manufactured or partly manufactured in Tarnów included barrels and components for the 25 mm 2M-3 and 2M-3M naval gun mounts, components for the 30 mm AK-230M naval gun system, and mechanical components of the periscopic sight used in the 2S1 Gvozdika self-propelled howitzer.

From the 1980s, development increasingly shifted towards Polish-designed equipment and domestic modifications of licensed weapons. In 1982, production began of the AWGŁ-3 automatic tear-gas grenade launcher for the Ministry of Internal Affairs. Between 1984 and 1986 OBRSM developed an extensively modernised version of the Wróbel naval gun. The resulting ZU-23-2MR Wróbel II combined twin 23 mm cannon with launchers for Strela-2M surface-to-air missiles and entered production in 1987.

Also in 1987, OBRSM and the Military Institute of Armament Technology developed the ZUR-23-2S Jod, a Polish modernisation of the ZU-23-2 fitted with a new sighting system and two Strela-2M missile launchers. During the economic and political changes of the late 1980s, declining military orders again increased the importance of civilian production, including numerically controlled machine tools.

=== Independence and NATO years ===
Following the end of the Cold War and reductions in the size of the Polish Armed Forces, military orders declined and civilian production again became more important to the company. During the 1990s, however, ZMT continued to modernize its military products. Poland's accession to NATO in 1999 provided an additional stimulus for this process, as existing and new weapons were adapted to NATO-standard ammunition, including 40 mm grenade-launcher ammunition.

One of the most important new programmes was the UKM-2000 general-purpose machine gun family chambered for the 7.62×51 mm NATO cartridge. After H. Cegielski – Poznań ended military small-arms production, manufacturing equipment for the Soviet-designed PKM/PKT family was transferred to Tarnów. ZMT did not introduce the original 7.62×54 mmR weapons into production there; instead, in 2003 it implemented the UKM-2000 family developed on the basis of the PKM system and documentation prepared by the Military University of Technology. Production of the UKM-2000 began in 2004, and the first weapons were delivered to the Polish Armed Forces in 2005.

During the same period, the separate Tarnów-based Ośrodek Badawczo-Rozwojowy Sprzętu Mechanicznego (OBRSM), which closely cooperated with ZMT, developed several weapon systems that were subsequently manufactured by the company. Between 2000 and 2004 OBRSM developed the 12.7 mm WKW Wilk anti-materiel rifle, which entered production at ZMT in 2005 as the Tor. Between 2004 and 2006 the centre developed the 7.62 mm Alex rifle, adopted by the Polish Armed Forces as the Bor, with deliveries beginning in 2008.

OBRSM also continued the development of short-range air-defense systems. In 2002 it developed the ZUR-23-2KG Jodek-G, an extensively modernized derivative of the ZU-23-2 family equipped with Grom surface-to-air missiles. Between 2000 and 2005 it developed the ZSU-23-4MP Biała, a Polish modernization of the ZSU-23-4 Shilka, while in 2004–2005 work was carried out on a family of remotely controlled weapon stations later manufactured by ZMT.

In 2002, ZMT became part of the newly established Bumar capital group. On 23 September 2002, the Polish State Treasury transferred an 80% shareholding in ZMT to PHZ Bumar as part of the restructuring of Poland's state-owned defense industry.

ZMT also participated in broader Polish armored-vehicle development programmes. The technology demonstrator of the Anders light combat vehicle presented at MSPO in 2010 was equipped with a remotely controlled Kobuz weapon station installed by Zakłady Mechaniczne Tarnów.

On 2 July 2012, Zakłady Mechaniczne Tarnów merged with OBRSM, with ZMT taking over the research and development centre. The merger combined the manufacturing facilities of ZMT with OBRSM's research and design capabilities in a single company.

In 2015, Zakłady Mechaniczne Tarnów became part of the Polish Armaments Group (PGZ), which consolidated a large part of Poland's state-controlled defense industry.

== Products ==
Zakłady Mechaniczne Tarnów develops and manufactures small arms, infantry support weapons, remotely controlled weapon stations, air-defense systems and counter-unmanned aircraft systems. In 2026, the company's publicly presented small-arms portfolio included the MWS-15 automatic carbine, MWS-25 semi-automatic precision rifle, UKM-2020S machine gun, RGP-40 repeating grenade launcher and LMP-2017 light infantry mortar.

=== Small arms ===
The MWS (Modular Weapon System) family is one of the company's main contemporary small-arms product lines. It includes the 5.56×45 mm NATO MWS-15 automatic carbine and the MWS-25 semi-automatic precision rifle chambered primarily for 7.62×51 mm NATO/.308 Winchester ammunition.

The company also manufactures the UKM-2000 family of 7.62×51 mm NATO machine guns. Its current derivatives include the UKM-2020S, a lighter and more compact variant intended particularly for light infantry, airborne and territorial-defense units.

Another area of development is precision and anti-materiel rifles. In 2026 ZMT announced that the 12.7 mm SR-50M anti-materiel and sniper rifle had reached readiness for serial production. The weapon represents a new generation of large-calibre precision rifles developed by the company alongside its earlier Bor and Tor designs.

=== Grenade launchers and mortars ===
The infantry support-weapons range includes the RGP-40 six-shot 40 mm repeating grenade launcher and the LMP-2017 60 mm light infantry mortar. The LMP-2017 has been produced in series for the Polish Armed Forces; 780 weapons were delivered under a contract completed in 2022.

ZMT has also developed the newer LMC 60.7 mm light mortar. The company continued to present the LMC together with its current small-arms portfolio in 2024–2025.

=== Remote weapon stations and counter-UAS systems ===
Remotely controlled weapon stations are another major area of the company's current activity. The ZSMU family is designed for integration with armored vehicles, light vehicles, unmanned ground vehicles, naval platforms and stationary installations. Depending on the variant, the stations can carry 7.62 mm or 12.7 mm machine guns and are fitted with optoelectronic observation and fire-control equipment.

At MSPO 2026 ZMT presented the ZSMU A3K integrated with the Legwan light tactical vehicle. The station is intended to engage ground targets and low-flying aerial targets during both day and night operations.

ZMT is also developing weapon systems for unmanned ground vehicles. The ZSMU A3C has been integrated with the THeMIS unmanned ground vehicle developed by Milrem Robotics. In September 2026 ZMT and Milrem signed an agreement covering further joint development and production of unmanned ground vehicles equipped with ZMT weapon systems for Polish and export customers.

A related development area is counter-UAS weaponry. At MSPO 2026 the company presented a kinetic counter-UAS system based on its electrically driven WLKM 12.7 mm multi-barrel machine gun. The demonstrated system integrated the weapon with a radar, an optoelectronic sensor head and a command station, allowing detection, identification and tracking of aerial targets and assisting the operator in selecting the moment to engage them.

=== Air-defense systems ===
ZMT also manufactures and supports short-range air-defense weapon systems based primarily on 23 mm automatic cannon. Its product range includes the ZUR-23-2KG Jodek-G gun-and-missile system, the naval ZU-23-2MR Wróbel II, the modernized ZSU-23-4MP Biała self-propelled system and 23 mm firing units used in the PSR-A Pilica very-short-range air-defense system.

=== Training systems ===
The company also produces training equipment and shooting-range systems. Its current offering includes mobile containerized shooting ranges, which were demonstrated by the Polish Armaments Group together with ZMT small arms during POLSECURE 2026.

== See also ==
- Economy of Poland
- FB "Łucznik" Radom
