= WLKM =

WLKM may refer to:

- WLKM-FM, a radio station (95.9 FM) licensed to Three Rivers, Michigan, United States
- WRCI, a radio station (1520 AM) licensed to Three Rivers, Michigan, United States, which held the call sign WLKM until September 2008
- WLKM machine gun — Polish rotary machine gun.
