= Targi Kielce =

Polish exhibition and congress centre

Coordinates: 50.8994°N 20.5860°E

Targi Kielce S.A.
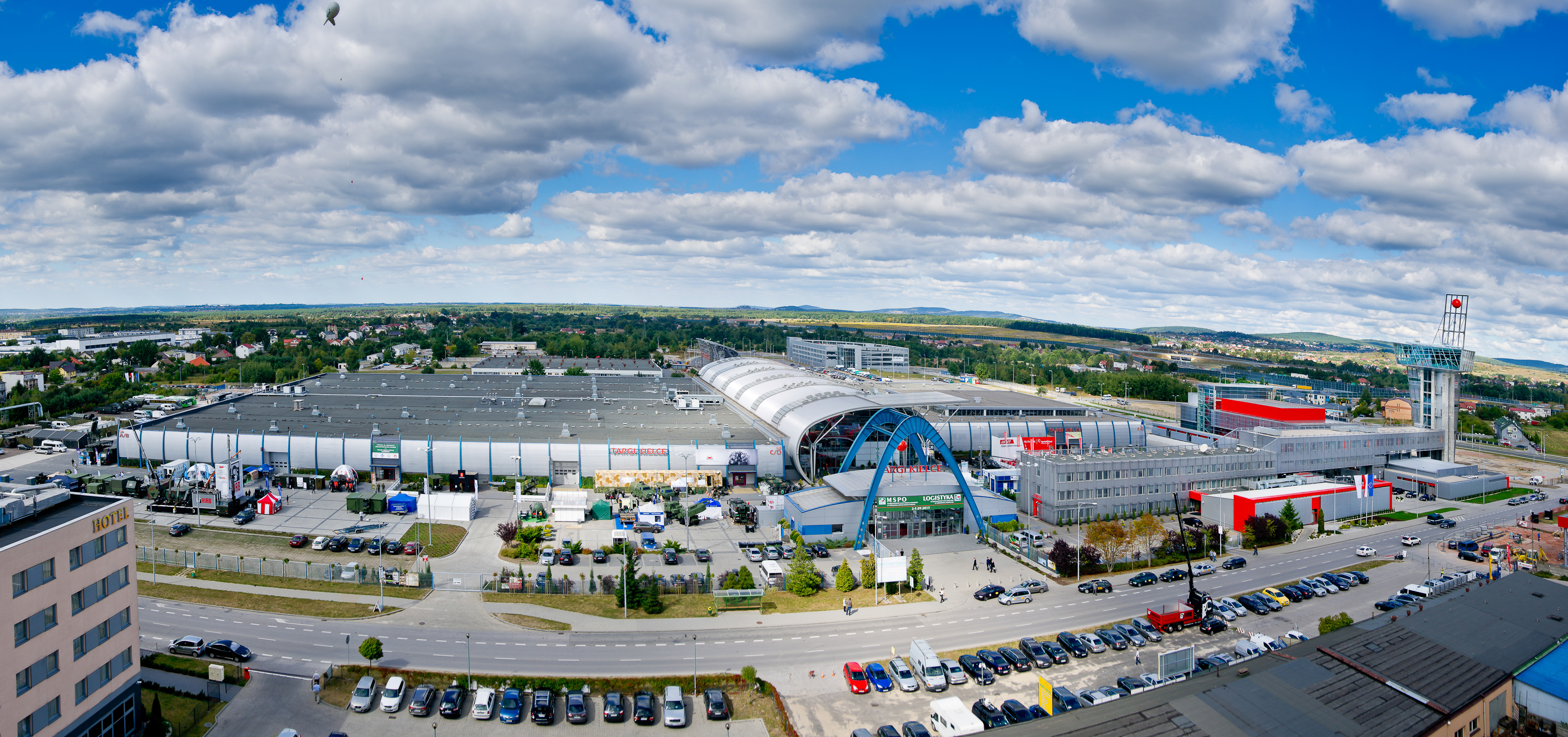
- General view of the exhibition grounds
- Type: Joint-stock company
- Industry: Trade fairs and exhibitions
- Founded: 1992 (as Centrum Targowe Kielce)
- Headquarters: ul. Zakładowa 1, 25-672 Kielce, Poland
- Key people: Andrzej Mochoń (President of the Management Board); Włodzimierz Stępień (Chairman of the Supervisory Board)
- Revenue: PLN 109,212,148.74 (2025)
- Operating income: PLN 16,545,174.80 (2025)
- Net income: PLN 15,551,408.69 (2025)
- Total assets: PLN 230,833,427.13 (2025)
- Total equity: PLN 153,208,865.26 (2025)
- Owner: City of Kielce – 99.9686%; private individuals – 0.0314%
- Website: www.targikielce.pl

Targi Kielce is a Polish exhibition and congress centre and a trade fair organiser based in Kielce, Poland. Established in 1992 as Centrum Targowe Kielce (Kielce Trade Fair Centre), it organises specialised trade fairs, exhibitions, conferences, congresses and other business events.

Targi Kielce is a member of UFI – The Global Association of the Exhibition Industry and the Polish Chamber of Exhibition Industry. The exhibition centre has nine halls with a combined area of 53,500 m^{2}, as well as a congress centre.

== History ==
Targi Kielce was established in 1992 under the name Centrum Targowe Kielce. Its creation was initiated by Kielce mayor Robert Rzepka, Kielce Voivode Józef Płoskonka and regional economic official Stanisław Gieroń, who secured a site for the exhibition centre and obtained the support of the Kielce city council.

The first trade fairs developed under the auspices of the Świętokrzyska Regional Development Agency. Roman Musiał was the agency's president and Andrzej Mochoń served as his deputy. Mochoń later became one of the organisers of the International Defence Industry Exhibition (MSPO), one of the first major-scale trade fairs held in Kielce. In 1996 he briefly served as president of the Kielce Trade Fair Centre.

From March 2000, Poznań International Fair held a decisive number of votes at the company's general meeting. Cooperation between the two exhibition companies ended after a dispute concerning the use of profits for the expansion of the Kielce exhibition centre. In 2006 the City of Kielce bought the shares held by Poznań International Fair.

The company adopted the name Targi Kielce in 2002. Andrzej Mochoń has served as president of the management board since 21 January 2006.

A major modernisation and expansion programme was completed in 2013. The project, partly financed from the European Union's Operational Programme Development of Eastern Poland 2007–2013, included new entrance terminals, Hall E (now Hall 5), the Congress Centre and a multi-storey car park. The total gross cost of the investments was PLN 189.858 million.

On 23 January 2025, a contract was signed for the construction of a new exhibition hall and the expansion of Hall 7. Construction began in May 2025. The new building comprises 15,500 m^{2} on the ground floor and a 3,000 m^{2} mezzanine. It is 15 metres high, has seven vehicle entrance gates and a floor load capacity of 100 kN/m^{2}. The project also includes photovoltaic installations and energy-storage systems, and its value was estimated at PLN 100 million.

On 12 January 2026 Targi Kielce signed a ten-year PLN 55 million loan agreement with Bank Gospodarstwa Krajowego to finance further construction work. The first event announced by the company for the new hall was the 34th International Defence Industry Exhibition, scheduled for 8–11 September 2026.

In 2022 Targi Kielce received the Honorary Badge of the Świętokrzyskie Voivodeship.

== Exhibition and congress facilities ==
The Targi Kielce site covers 90,000 m^{2} of exhibition grounds. According to the company, its nine permanent exhibition halls have a combined area of 53,500 m^{2}. Temporary halls are erected for some of the largest events. For example, the 2018 AGROTECH agricultural fair occupied eleven halls.

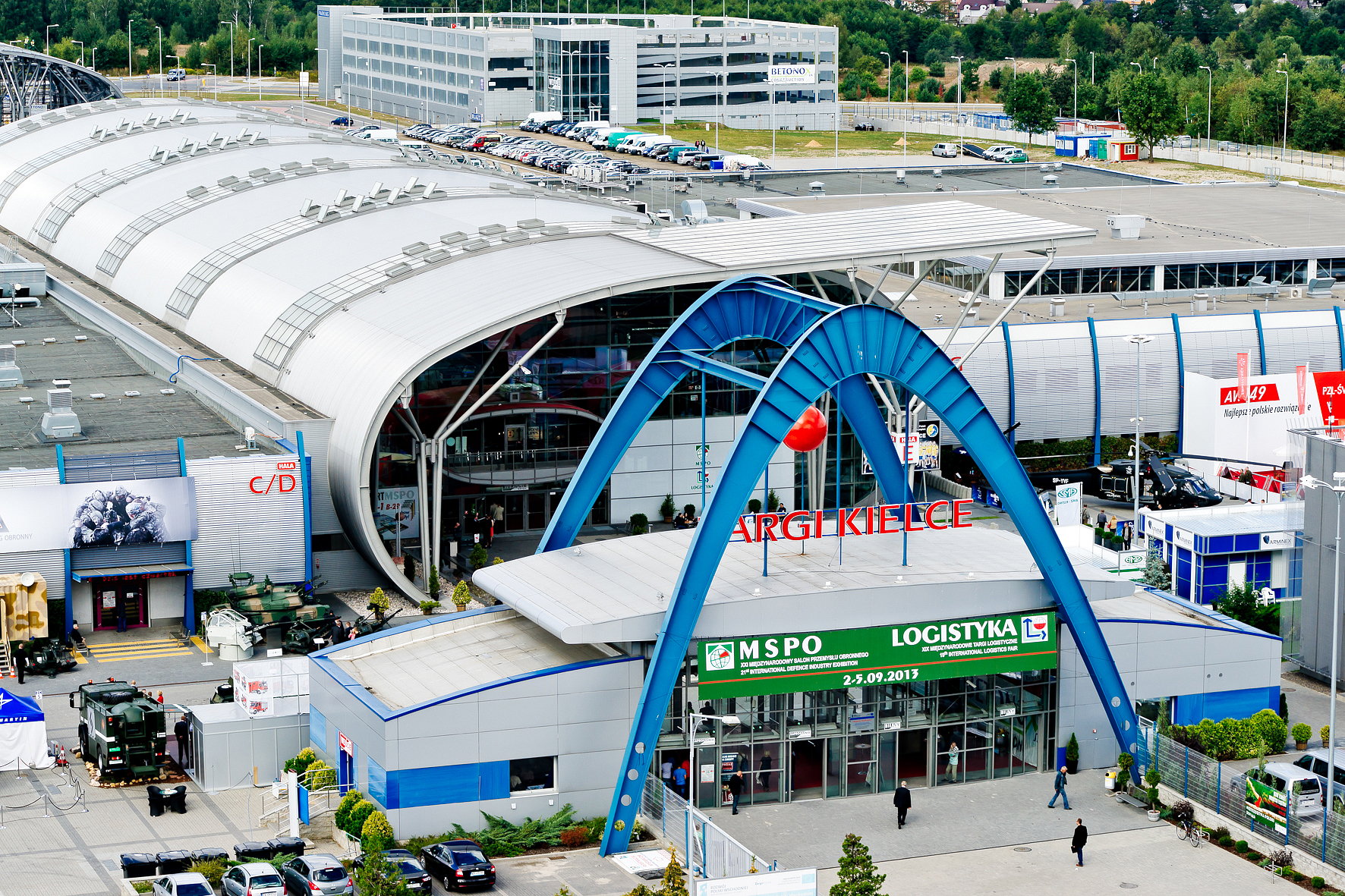
Eastern entrance terminal, 2013

The Targi Kielce Congress Centre opened on 28 August 2013. It can accommodate approximately 1,000 people and contains eight conference rooms, including a main auditorium seating 700. The complex also includes a 57-metre tower containing conference and banquet facilities.

== Trade fairs and events ==
Targi Kielce organises several dozen trade-fair events as well as more than 300 conferences, congresses and other events each year. Its programme covers the defence, agriculture, plastics, energy, industrial technology, transport, construction, public security, religious goods and consumer-products sectors.

One of the best-known events held at the centre is the annual International Defence Industry Exhibition (MSPO), one of the major defence-industry exhibitions in Europe. It presents military equipment, defence technologies and security-related solutions.

Among the other major events is AGROTECH, the International Fair of Agricultural Techniques. The 2025 edition attracted more than 80,000 visitors. PLASTPOL is devoted to plastics and rubber processing, while SACROEXPO covers church construction and furnishing, religious art and devotional products.

The centre's industrial exhibitions include the group of events known as the Industrial Spring, including STOM, CONTROL-STOM, KIELCE FLUID POWER, EXPO-SURFACE and exhibitions devoted to welding, machine tools, measurement technologies, pneumatics, hydraulics and surface treatment.

Other major recurring events include ENEX, devoted to energy and renewable-energy technologies; TSW – Fruit and Vegetable Industry Fair; DACH FORUM, a congress and trade fair for roofers, tinsmiths and carpenters; KIDS' TIME, covering toys and products for children and parents; TRANSEXPO, devoted to public transport; POLSECURE, focused on public security; and AUTOSTRADA Nowa Infrastruktura, a construction-infrastructure trade fair.

Tourism-related events include AGRO & Active TRAVEL, devoted to rural tourism and active recreation, and SLOWTRAVEL, focusing on forms of travel marketed as sustainable or experience-oriented.

== International activity ==
Targi Kielce has also organised trade fairs outside Poland. Five editions of PLASTUKRAINA were held in Kyiv, the last in 2008, and two editions of the Road Engineering fair were also organised there. In cooperation with the Ukrainian company GAL-EXPO, Targi Kielce organised two editions of the EuroAgro International Agricultural Technology Fair in Lviv, with the second taking place in 2017. The Lviv Bike-Expo exhibition was held in September 2018.

In 2023 Targi Kielce launched Sacroexpo Slovakia at the Incheba Expo exhibition centre in Bratislava. A second edition was held in 2024.

== See also ==
- MSPO
- Poznań International Fair
