= UKM-2000 =

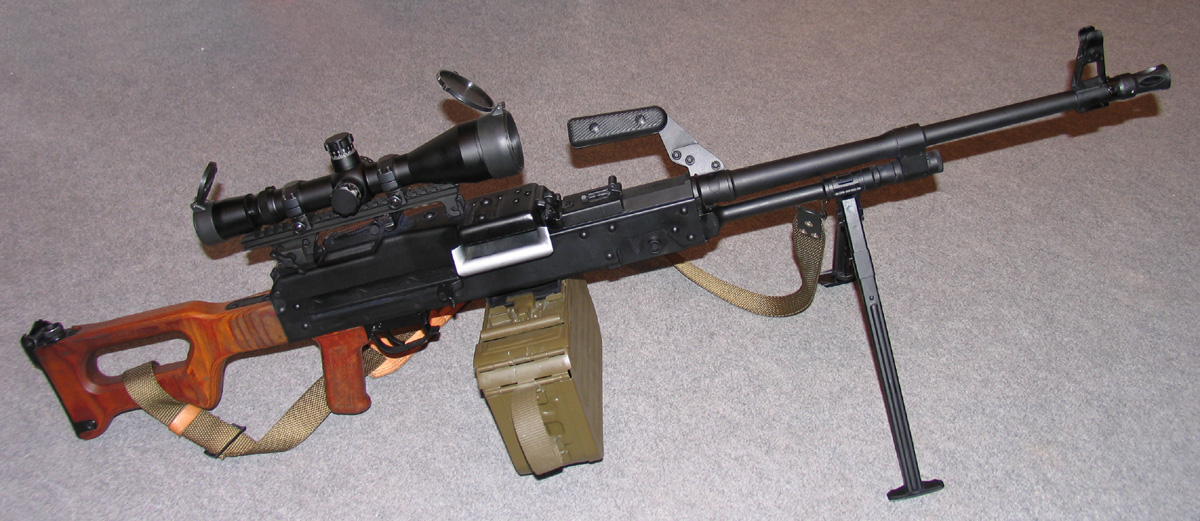
- UKM-2000P
- Type: General-purpose machine gun
- Place of origin: Poland

Service history
- Used by: See Users
- Wars: War in Afghanistan (2001-2021); Iraq War; Russo-Ukrainian War

Production history
- Designed: 2000
- Manufacturer: Zakłady Mechaniczne Tarnów
- Variants: UKM-2000P, UKM-2000D, UKM-2000C, UKM-2000CL

Specifications
- Mass: 8.4 kg (18.52 lb) (P); 8.9 kg (19.62 lb) (D); 10.7 kg (23.59 lb) (C/CL)
- Length: 1,203 mm (47.4 in) (P/D); 1,098 mm (43.2 in) (C/CL)
- Barrel length: 547 mm (21.5 in) (P/D); 636 mm (25.0 in) (C/CL)
- Width: 91.5 mm (3.60 in)
- Height: 212 mm (8.3 in) (P/D); 117 mm (4.6 in) (C/CL)
- Cartridge: 7.62×51mm NATO
- Action: Gas-operated, open bolt
- Rate of fire: 700-850 rounds/min Practical: 250 rounds/min
- Muzzle velocity: 840 m/s (2,756 ft/s) (P/D); 850 m/s (2,789 ft/s) (C/CL)
- Effective firing range: 1,500 m (1,640 yd)
- Feed system: Disintegrating M13 belt 100 or 200 (P/D) or 250-round ((C/CL)) in ammunition boxes

The UKM-2000 (Uniwersalny Karabin Maszynowy, "Universal Machine Gun") is a 7.62×51mm NATO general-purpose machine gun designed and manufactured by Zakłady Mechaniczne Tarnów in Tarnów, Poland.

== Development ==
On March 12, 1999, Poland joined the North Atlantic Treaty Organization (NATO). A problem arose with modifying the weapons of the Polish Army to use the standard NATO ammunition. A decision was made to develop a new general-purpose machine gun. The construction was based on the design of the successful PKM machine gun that was previously produced under licence in Poland.

To use the common NATO ammunition, the feeding method of the machine gun had to be fundamentally modified. The metallic disintegrating link specifically designed for ammunition belt-fed firearms and rimless 7.62×51mm NATO rounds used by NATO is a push-through design. The UKM machine gun extracts 7.62×51mm NATO rounds from open-M13 links by pushing them forward out of the link directly into the chamber for firing. The non-disintegrating closed-link metallic belt type used in the PKM machine gun is a pull-out design, which extracts the rimmed 7.62×54mmR rounds by pulling them rearward out of the link. In the second stage, the rimmed rounds are pushed forward into the chamber for firing. The 7.62×54mmR machine gun feed pawl mechanism is radically different than that of 7.62×51mm NATO chambered machine guns based on the MG 42 machine gun feeding method, using a small, simple pivoting arm pushed out to the right side by the bolt carrier, rather than a much larger (and therefore much heavier) articulated feed cam, lever, and pawl assembly.

The UKM-2000 is a primary general-purpose machine gun (GPMG) on most vehicles used by Polish Forces in Afghanistan (Cougar H, MaxxPro Dash, M-ATV, Humvee) and is a coaxial machine gun in KTO Rosomak and Polish-modernized BRDM-2.

There is a proposal to modernize the Polish UKM-2000 GPMG fed by 7.62×51mm NATO to the new UKM-2013 standard. The upgraded GPMG will be equipped with a new folding and telescopic buttstock with a cheekpiece and additional grip/pod, the integrated Picatinny rail with iron sight and 3-rail forehand attached to the gas tube, a new grip, a new cocking handle, a new safety switch selector, a new 440-mm barrel (as an option) plus some additional internal changes. The Polish Army is interested in this machine gun fed from the 100-round soft ammo bag instead of a steel box. Because of external similarity to the Russian PKM GPMG chambered to the 7.62×54mmR some elements like a buttstock, a grip or a handguard with rails will be able to be used with the Kalashnikov design.

== Variants ==
- UKM-2000C - (C for "czołgowy" - tank variant) coaxial version of UKM-2000, successor of the PKT. Use on KTO Rosomak and some Polish modernized BRDM-2. Modifications include the removal of the stock, a longer and heavier barrel, a gas regulator and an electric solenoid trigger.
- UKM-2000CL - coaxial version of UKM-2000 feed from the left side (like FN MAG, unlike PKM or regular UKM-2000, intended to be used on western remote weapon stations like Konsberg Protector),
- UKM-2000D - airborne version with folding stock, limited use in Polish Armed Forces
- UKM-2000P - (P for "piechoty" - infantry variant) standard GPMG version, some also equipped with MIL-STD-1913 rail.
- UKM-2000Z - first attempt to modernization of UKM-2000, new telescoping stock and black polymer pistol grip. It wasn't adopted.
- UKM-2013C(L) - modernization of UKM-2000C(L) presented in 2012
- UKM-2013P - modernization of UKM-2000P presented in 2012, better ergonomy and functionality, new folding and telescopic buttstock with a cheekpiece and additional grip/pod, the integrated Picatinny rail with iron sight and 3-rail forehand attached to the gas tube, new grip, new cocking handle new safety switch selector, a new 440-mm barrel (as an option) plus some additional internal changes, new soft ammo bag instead of typical for PK family steel box magazine
- UKM-2000M/UKM-2015 - version that presumably was in testing mid-2014, probably for introduction in 2015
- UKM-2020S - Shorter and lighter version of UKM-2000 with folding stock
- UKM-2023CL - Coaxial machine gun with a left feed side.

The L in a coaxial version denotes the ammunition is fed from the left instead of from the right.

== Users ==
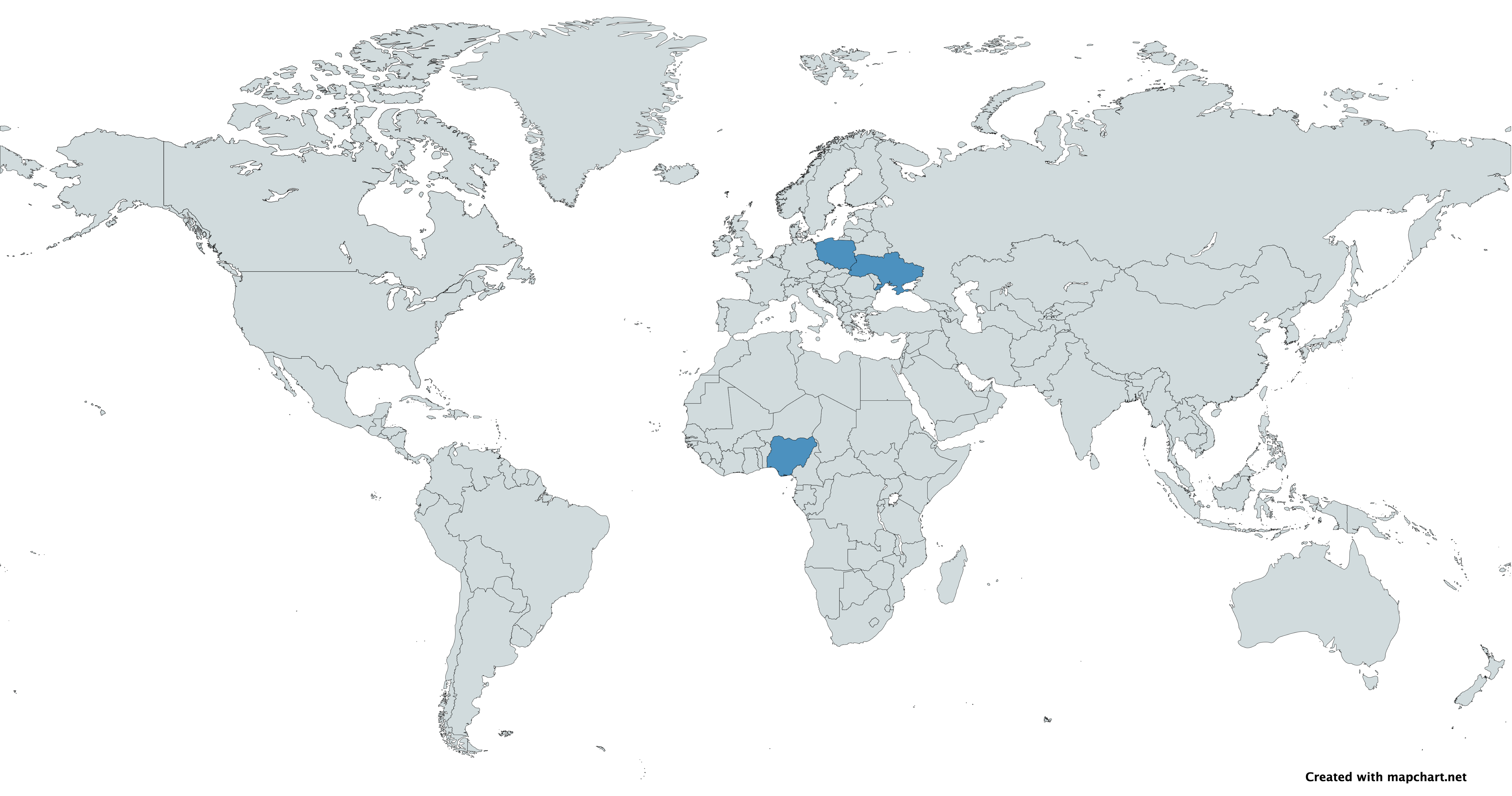
Map with UKM-2000 users in blue

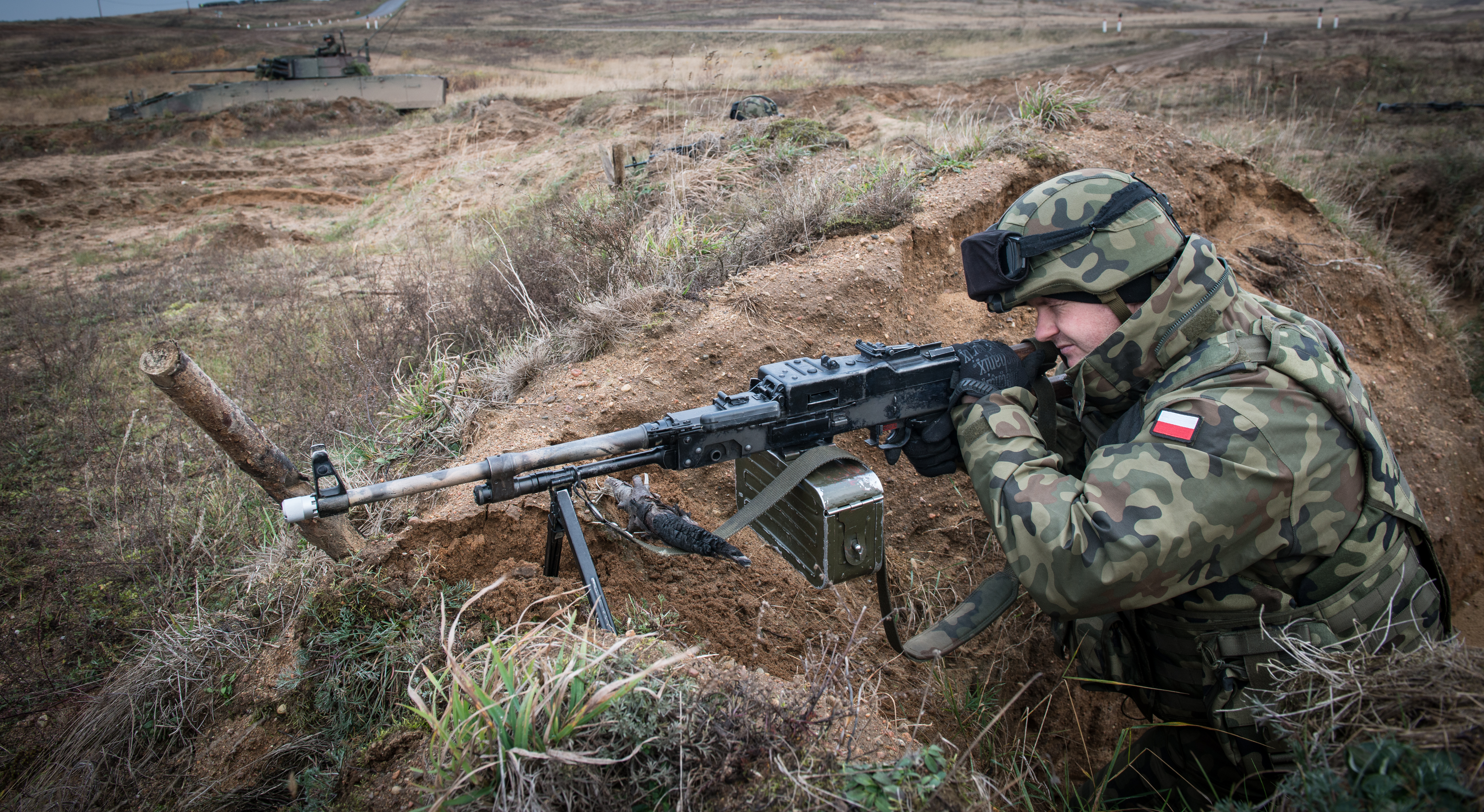
UKM-2000P in Polish service

- Poland - around 1200 examples used by Polish Land Forces and Military Gendarmerie, around 2,500 on order (UKM-2000M version)
- Nigeria - ca. 50 used (version with wooden buttstock)
- Ukraine - unknown number (given to Ukraine from June 2022)
