= WLKM 12.7 mm =

- WLKM 12.7 mm on a remote-controlled weapon station at MSPO 2026
- Type: Heavy machine gun
- Place of origin: Poland

Production history
- Designer: OBR SM Tarnów
- Manufacturer: Zakłady Mechaniczne Tarnów
- Produced: 2026–present

Specifications
- Mass: 50 kg
- Length: 1300 mm
- Barrel length: 900 mm
- Cartridge: 12.7×99mm NATO (.50 BMG)
- Caliber: 12.7 mm
- Barrels: 4
- Action: Externally powered Gatling-type system, barrel cluster rotated by an electric motor
- Rate of fire: 3,600 rounds/min
- Feed system: M9 disintegrating-link belt

The WLKM 12.7 mm is a Polish four-barrel heavy machine gun using an externally powered Gatling-type mechanism. It was designed in Tarnów and is manufactured by Zakłady Mechaniczne Tarnów. It is chambered for 12.7×99mm NATO (.50 BMG) ammunition fed by an M9 disintegrating-link belt. The four rotating barrels allow a theoretical rate of fire of 3,600 rounds per minute. The weapon can be used as aircraft armament, on ground vehicles and naval vessels, and on fixed and portable weapon mounts. It is intended to engage both ground and aerial targets.

== History ==
Development of a Polish externally powered 12.7 mm multi-barrel machine gun began at the Ośrodek Badawczo-Rozwojowy Sprzętu Mechanicznego (OBR SM, Research and Development Centre for Mechanical Equipment) in Tarnów. The tactical and technical requirements for the new weapon were developed in 2005, and design work began in March 2007. A test rig was constructed around the turn of 2007 and 2008, while the first model was planned for completion in 2009.

One of the originally envisaged applications was to arm a remotely controlled weapon station for the W-3PL Głuszec helicopter. The proposed weapon was to use 12.7×99mm NATO ammunition, have four barrels and achieve a rate of fire of at least 3,600 rounds per minute. According to later reports, the concept of using a multi-barrel weapon of this calibre was linked to the requirement for a higher rate of fire than could be provided by the single heavy machine gun used in the helicopter weapon station.

In subsequent years, the WLKM was also developed as an armament for land and naval systems and for systems intended to counter unmanned aerial vehicles (UAVs). At MSPO 2021, Zakłady Mechaniczne Tarnów unveiled a remote controlled weapon station equipped with the WLKM, developed under a project conducted from 2018 to 2021 for a system intended to counter miniature UAVs. The module operated together with an electro-optical head, while a radar station was also envisaged for target detection.

In late 2021, trials of a counter-UAV system developed by Zakłady Mechaniczne Tarnów and the Military University of Technology were conducted at the Central Air Force Training Range in Ustka. During the trials, the remotely controlled firing unit armed with the WLKM was integrated with an electro-optical head and a radar station. The tests included the detection, tracking and engagement of mini- and micro-class UAVs.

== Design ==
The WLKM is an externally powered Gatling-type weapon. It consists of four barrels and bolts, a rotor assembly, receiver assembly, ammunition feed system, recoil absorber, and drive and control systems. The four-barrel cluster is rotated by a DC motor. In the configuration presented by the manufacturer in 2016, the drive system operated at 27 V and continuously drew 400 A. The electric drive is also used to reload the weapon and feed ammunition.

Rotation of the barrel cluster synchronises the operating cycle of the individual barrels; as the cluster rotates, each barrel successively passes through the loading, firing and case-extraction phases. Distributing successive shots among four barrels reduces barrel heating and permits a high rate of fire.

The electronic control system allowed the rate of fire to be adjusted between 2,500 and 3,600 rounds per minute and enabled burst length to be programmed; the maximum permitted burst was 200 rounds. In the naval configuration presented in 2014, the control unit allowed the operator to select bursts of between 50 and 200 rounds or continuous fire until the ammunition supply was exhausted.

The 12.7×99mm NATO ammunition is fed using an M9 disintegrating-link belt. The weapon was designed to fire various types of 12.7×99mm NATO ammunition, including sub-calibre and multipurpose rounds.

According to data presented by the manufacturer in 2016, the service life of the weapon exceeded 10,000 rounds, while barrel life was 2,500 rounds.

In its current configuration, the manufacturer gives the weapon's weight as 50 kg, overall length as 1,300 mm and barrel length as 900 mm. Published range figures vary by source: the manufacturer's 2020 catalogue gives a range of 2,000 m, while a 2026 publication gives an effective range of up to 2,200 m. A 2016 analysis of possible applications of the WLKM gave more detailed figures depending on the type of target: up to 1,500 m against lightly armoured combat vehicles and aerial targets, and up to 2,000 m against personnel.

== Applications ==
The WLKM was designed for installation on a range of weapon platforms. The manufacturer envisages its use as armament for aircraft, ground vehicles and naval vessels, as well as on fixed and portable weapon mounts. The weapon is intended to engage ground and aerial targets with varying levels of protection.

=== Aircraft applications ===
The original concept behind the WLKM was to develop a domestic replacement for the four-barrel Yak-B 12.7 machine gun used on Mil Mi-24 helicopters and to adapt the new weapon to the standard NATO 12.7×99mm cartridge. Analyses of potential applications envisaged its use in movable under-fuselage weapon stations, suspended gun pods and other aircraft weapon mounts.

The WLKM can be installed in a movable turret, as a fixed weapon attached to the airframe, in a gun pod suspended from a pylon, or at a firing position in a helicopter cargo compartment.

Zakłady Mechaniczne Tarnów developed the LZS-12,7WLKM aircraft gun pod, intended for carriage on standard aircraft and helicopter hardpoints using either NATO-standard mountings or the earlier Warsaw Pact standard, including the BD3-55M. The pod can be armed with a 12.7 mm WLKM supplied with 12.7×99mm NATO ammunition and is intended to engage both ground and aerial targets.

Another proposed method of integration was the remotely controlled ZSW-12.7 under-fuselage weapon station. A station of this type armed with the WKM-B machine gun was introduced on W-3PL Głuszec helicopters, while the manufacturer envisaged the WLKM as an optional armament for the ZSW-12.7.

The WLKM was also included in a Polish industry proposal presented at MSPO 2019 for the modernisation of Mil Mi-24 helicopters. Zakłady Mechaniczne Tarnów proposed replacing the Soviet four-barrel Yak-B 12.7 machine gun with the Polish WLKM firing 12.7×99mm NATO ammunition. The proposed modernisation package also provided for the use of external gun pods containing the WLKM. This was a modernisation proposal rather than a configuration introduced into operational service.

=== Ground systems and counter-UAV applications ===
The WLKM's high rate of fire led to its development as a kinetic effector for systems intended to counter unmanned aerial vehicles. In a project conducted between 2018 and 2021 to develop a system for countering miniature UAVs, the weapon was integrated with a remotely controlled firing unit, an electro-optical head and a radar system and presented as a counter-UAV system. During trials at the Ustka range, the system was used to detect, track and engage mini- and micro-class UAVs.

Zakłady Mechaniczne Tarnów counter-UAV system with a WLKM 12.7 mm mounted on a Legwan vehicle at MSPO 2026

At MSPO 2023, a self-propelled variant of the Zakłady Mechaniczne Tarnów counter-UAV system was displayed on a Waran 4×4 vehicle. Its kinetic effector was the WLKM 12.7 mm, and the system was also equipped with an electro-optical unit for target detection and tracking. The Waran represented a demonstration of one possible carrier configuration for the system.

The system presented on the Waran provided several levels of automation, ranging from manual aiming of the firing unit, through target cueing and tracking based on radar data, to automatic target acquisition, while leaving the decision to open fire to the operator.

At MSPO 2026, the WLKM was also displayed in a remote controlled weapon station mounted on a small tracked platform. At the same time, Zakłady Mechaniczne Tarnów and Milrem Robotics signed an agreement on cooperation involving unmanned ground vehicles integrated with remotely controlled weapon systems produced by the Tarnów company.

=== SAN system ===
The WLKM was selected as one of the kinetic effectors of the Polish SAN air-defence and counter-UAV system. On 30 January 2026, the Polish Armaments Agency signed a contract with a consortium formed by Polska Grupa Zbrojeniowa and Kongsberg Defence & Aerospace for the delivery of 18 battery modules of the system. Each module is to consist of three firing platoons and one support platoon.

The WLKM is planned for two of the three firing platoons in each battery. A total of 36 WLKM weapons are envisaged under the SAN programme. In February 2026, Polska Grupa Zbrojeniowa stated that the weapon had entered serial production and completed a cycle of factory tests, while the firing-unit configuration for the SAN system was being prepared for extended factory trials preceding military and qualification testing. The Armaments Agency stated that, during negotiations, the contractor had declared technology readiness level VIII for the WLKM. Deliveries of the WLKM under the programme were scheduled for 2026–2027.

On 19 February 2026, during tests in Zielonka, part of the SAN system's combat operation was publicly demonstrated for the first time. One of its components was a WLKM system with a 12.7 mm kinetic effector mounted on a Legwan Long chassis.

At MSPO 2026, a Zakłady Mechaniczne Tarnów kinetic counter-UAV system mounted on a Legwan vehicle was displayed, in which the WLKM operated together with an electro-optical head, radar and command station. The system enables target detection, identification and tracking and assists the operator in selecting the moment at which to open fire.

=== Naval applications ===
The WLKM was also envisaged for use as armament aboard naval vessels. A naval version of the weapon was presented at the Balt Military Expo trade fair in Gdańsk in 2014. The weapon, which had previously undergone preliminary factory trials, was mounted on a pedestal mount of the type used aboard ships for the single-barrel WKM-B. The station was equipped with a controller allowing burst length to be programmed and a collimator sight.

In this configuration, the WLKM was envisaged for engaging small, fast surface craft, naval mines and low-flying aerial targets, including UAVs. The manufacturer also indicated that the weapon's high rate of fire could allow it to serve as a last line of defence against approaching missiles.

== Specifications ==
- Ammunition: 12.7×99mm NATO (.50 BMG)
- Number of barrels: 4
- Ammunition feed: M9 disintegrating-link belt
- Length: 1,300 mm
- Barrel length: 900 mm
- Weapon weight: 50 kg
- Muzzle velocity: at least 800 m/s, depending on ammunition type
- Theoretical rate of fire: 3,600 rounds/min
- Adjustable rate of fire: 2,500–3,600 rounds/min in the configuration described in 2016
- Programmable burst length: up to 200 rounds; in the 2014 naval configuration, bursts of 50–200 rounds or continuous fire
- Range against lightly armoured targets and aerial targets: up to 1,500 m according to a 2016 analysis
- Range against personnel: up to 2,000 m according to a 2016 analysis
- Range: 2,000 m according to the manufacturer's 2020 catalogue
- Effective range: up to 2,200 m according to data published in 2026
- Electrical supply: 27 V/400 A in the configuration described in 2016
