= MSPO =

Defence industry trade fair in Kielce, Poland

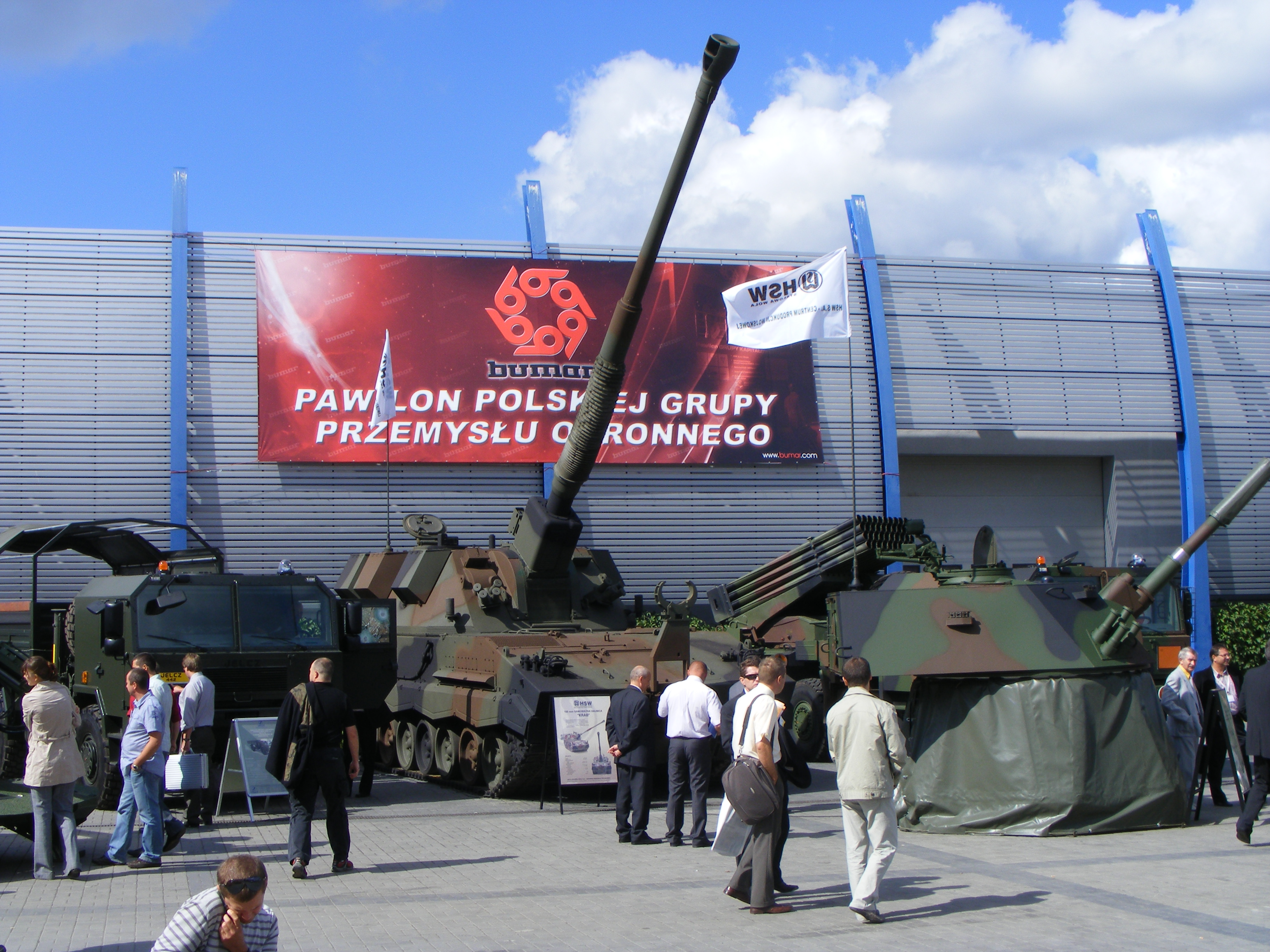
International Defence Industry Exhibition in 2008

Międzynarodowy Salon Przemysłu Obronnego (MSPO; English: International Defence Industry Exhibition) is an annual defence industry trade fair held at Targi Kielce in Kielce, Poland. Established in 1993, it is the largest defence trade fair in Central and Eastern Europe and is commonly ranked among the three largest defence industry exhibitions in Europe, alongside Eurosatory in Paris and DSEI in London.

The exhibition presents military equipment and technologies and serves as a meeting place for defence companies, armed forces, government representatives, military procurement institutions, foreign delegations and experts. The programme also includes conferences, seminars, debates, business meetings and the signing of contracts and cooperation agreements.

The 2025 edition attracted 811 exhibitors from 35 countries, almost 39,000 participants and official delegations from 42 countries, with an exhibition area of nearly 40,000 m². The 34th edition is scheduled for 8–11 September 2026. As of 14 August 2026, more than 1,000 exhibitors from 40 countries had confirmed their participation.

== History ==
The first MSPO was held in September 1993. It was initially organised by the Świętokrzyska Regional Development Agency and attracted 85 exhibitors from five countries. In 2002, following the transformation of the Kielce Trade Fair Centre into Targi Kielce, organisation of MSPO was taken over by Targi Kielce.

At the first exhibition in 1993, Polish manufacturers presented, among other equipment, the PT-91 Twardy tank and prototype armoured vehicles including the BWP-40, BWO-40 and MTLB-23M.

In 1999, in connection with Poland's accession to NATO, the first Polish Armed Forces Exhibition was organised as part of MSPO. The inaugural exhibition, entitled Granica ("Border"), presented the capabilities of the Polish Land Forces. In subsequent editions it developed to include equipment from different branches of the armed forces and dynamic demonstrations.

Since 2004, MSPO has also featured Lead Nation or National Exhibitions, in which a selected country or, in some years, an international organisation presents its defence industry and military capabilities.

The Polish Armaments Group (PGZ) became MSPO's strategic partner in 2016. The exhibition is organised in cooperation with the Polish Ministry of National Defence.

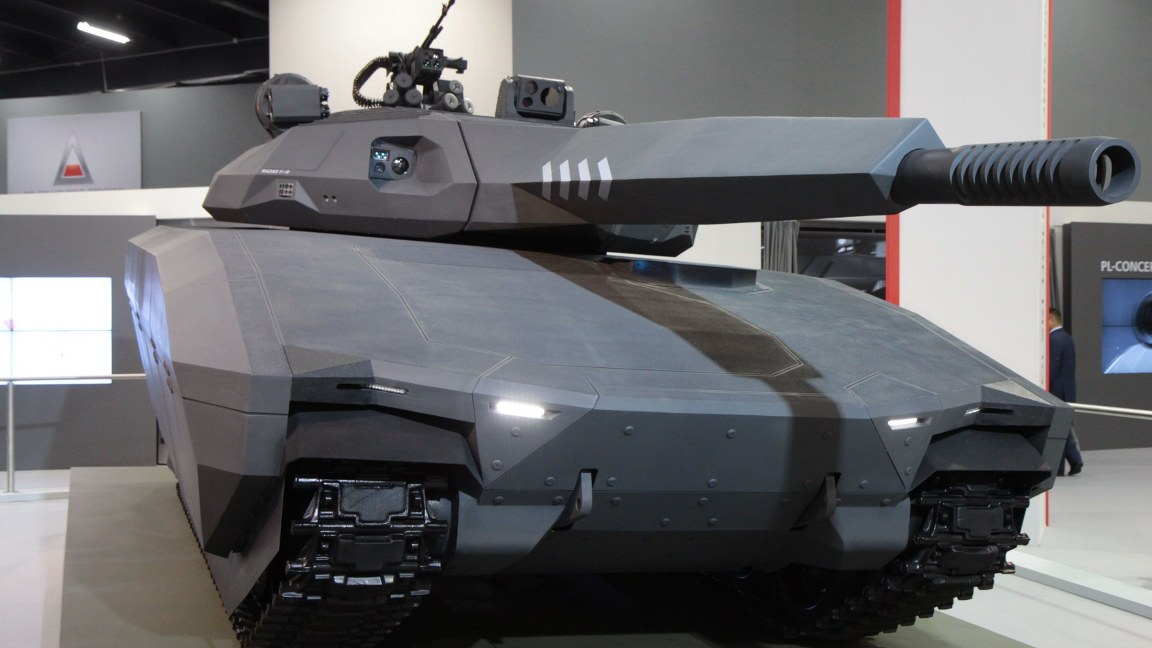
The PL-01 concept vehicle at MSPO 2013

The scale of the exhibition increased substantially during the 21st century. In 2012 seven halls with a combined exhibition area of 27,166 m² were used. In 2023, exhibition space exceeded 34,000 m² and more than 710 companies from 35 countries took part.

The 2020 exhibition was held during the COVID-19 pandemic in Poland under sanitary restrictions. Participation fell to 185 companies from 15 countries and the event was shortened to three days. The following year the traditional single Lead Nation Exhibition was replaced by National Pavilions representing, among others, the United States, the United Kingdom, Germany, Australia, France and Italy.

For many years MSPO was held together with the International Logistics Fair LOGISTYKA, devoted to logistics and support equipment for the armed forces and uniformed services. Its exhibits included uniforms, food and catering equipment, storage and transport systems, medical equipment, communications and information technology systems. The 25th LOGISTYKA exhibition, accompanying MSPO in 2019, included 60 companies. LOGISTYKA was still organised alongside MSPO in 2021.

A new exhibition hall is scheduled to enter service during MSPO 2026. It provides 15,500 m² of ground-floor exhibition space, approximately 3,000 m² of mezzanine space and a height of 15 metres. With the new facility, Targi Kielce states that its total indoor exhibition space will reach 53,500 m² across nine halls. The hall was designed to accommodate heavy vehicles and large military equipment as well as exhibitions of unmanned systems, cybersecurity and other advanced technologies.

== Awards ==
Products and technologies presented at MSPO compete for a number of awards. They include the President of the Republic of Poland's Award, the Special Distinction of the Minister of National Defence and the DEFENDER awards, as well as distinctions presented by other public institutions and military authorities.

The President of the Republic of Poland's Award has been presented at MSPO since 2009 and is awarded to a product intended to improve the safety of Polish Armed Forces personnel.

== Number of exhibitors over the years ==
- 1993 – 85 exhibitors from 5 countries
- 2002 – 237 exhibitors from 20 countries
- 2003 – 272 exhibitors from 22 countries
- 2004 – 283 exhibitors from 22 countries
- 2007 – 364 exhibitors from 21 countries
- 2012 – 396 exhibitors from 29 countries
- 2015 – 583 exhibitors from 30 countries
- 2016 – 614 exhibitors from 30 countries
- 2017 – 618 exhibitors from 27 countries
- 2018 – 624 exhibitors from 31 countries
- 2019 – 610 exhibitors from 31 countries
- 2020 – 185 exhibitors from 15 countries
- 2021 – 400 exhibitors from 27 countries
- 2022 – 613 exhibitors from 33 countries
- 2023 – 711 exhibitors from 35 countries
- 2024 – 769 exhibitors from 34 countries
- 2025 – 811 exhibitors from 35 countries
- 2026 – more than 1,000 exhibitors from 40 countries had confirmed participation by 14 August 2026; the figure is a pre-event total rather than a final attendance statistic.

== National exhibitions ==
Lead Nation Exhibitions have been organised at MSPO since 2004. They are intended to provide a focused presentation of the defence industry and military capabilities of a selected country. The format has not been identical in every year; the European Defence Agency has also participated in this role, while some editions used national pavilions or a special-guest format instead.

- 2004 – Germany
- 2005 – France
- 2006 – Israel
- 2007 – United States
- 2008 – Sweden
- 2009 – V4 countries
- 2010 – United Kingdom
- 2011 – European Defence Agency (EDA)
- 2012 – Italy
- 2013 – Turkey
- 2014 – France
- 2015 – Norway
- 2016 – Poland
- 2017 – South Korea
- 2018 – Poland, with the exhibition linked to the centenary of the restoration of Polish independence
- 2019 – United States
- 2020 – United Kingdom
- 2021 – National Pavilions representing, among others, the United States, United Kingdom, Germany, Australia, France and Italy, instead of a single Lead Nation Exhibition
- 2022 – Turkey
- 2023 – South Korea
- 2024 – Ukraine was the special guest of MSPO rather than being presented as a Lead Nation
- 2025 – Team Defence Australia organised an Australian national pavilion at MSPO.
- 2026 – Canada, as the Lead Nation and organiser of the Canadian National Exhibition

== Polish Armed Forces Exhibition ==
The Polish Armed Forces Exhibition has accompanied MSPO since 1999. Its first edition commemorated Poland's accession to NATO and focused on the capabilities of the Polish Land Forces. The exhibition subsequently expanded to cover the various branches of the armed forces and to include both static displays and dynamic demonstrations.

The 25th-anniversary Armed Forces Exhibition was held during MSPO 2024 under the theme "25 years of Poland in NATO – 25 years of security". More than 1,000 Polish soldiers were involved in preparing the military exhibition.

The 27th Armed Forces Exhibition is scheduled to accompany MSPO 2026 under the theme "Innovation and AI technologies as determinants of modern armed forces", with particular emphasis on artificial intelligence, autonomous systems and new military technologies.

== Branch range ==
MSPO covers a broad range of defence and security sectors, including:

- armoured vehicles and equipment;
- small arms, artillery, missile systems and ammunition;
- explosives and pyrotechnics;
- aviation and air-defence systems;
- naval equipment and weapon systems;
- equipment for chemical, biological, radiological and nuclear protection;
- equipment for police, border guards, rescue and other uniformed services;
- wheeled, tracked and amphibious vehicles;
- communications, command-and-control and information systems;
- radar, radio-electronic and optoelectronic equipment;
- engineering, logistics and medical equipment;
- uniforms, soldier systems and personal protective equipment;
- infrastructure and systems for the protection of people and property.

In more recent editions, unmanned aerial and ground systems, counter-unmanned aircraft systems, cybersecurity, satellite technologies, autonomous systems, artificial intelligence and dual-use technologies have become increasingly prominent parts of the exhibition and conference programme.

== Targi Kielce ==
Targi Kielce is one of the principal exhibition and congress centres in Poland. Before its 2026 expansion it offered approximately 36,000 m² of indoor exhibition space in seven permanent halls.

A new 15,500 m² exhibition hall, with a further approximately 3,000 m² on a mezzanine, is scheduled to open for MSPO 2026. Following the expansion, the centre states that it will have 53,500 m² of exhibition space across nine halls.

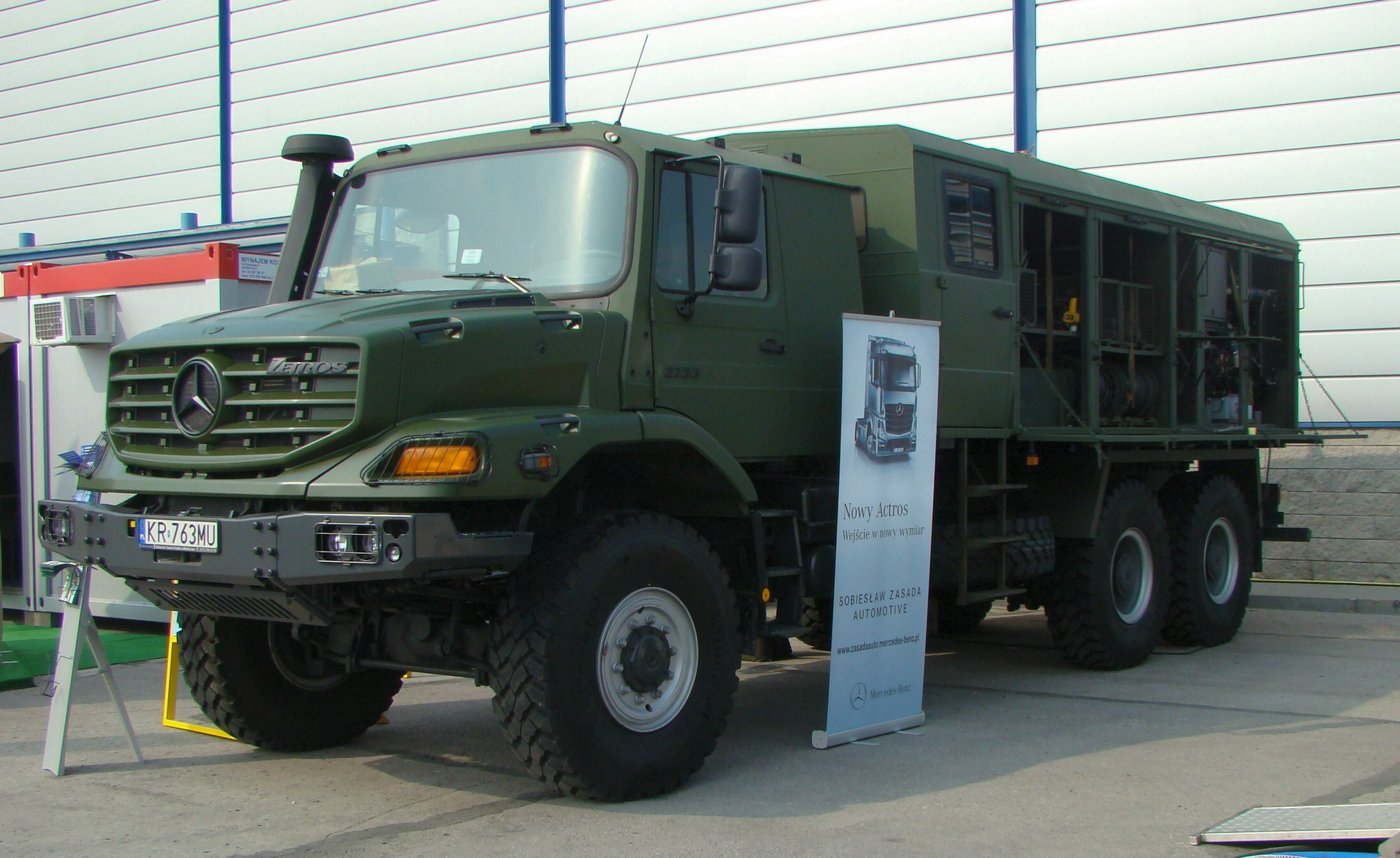
Zetros 2733 at MSPO in 2012
