= FB MSBS Grot =

Polish modular assault rifle and variants

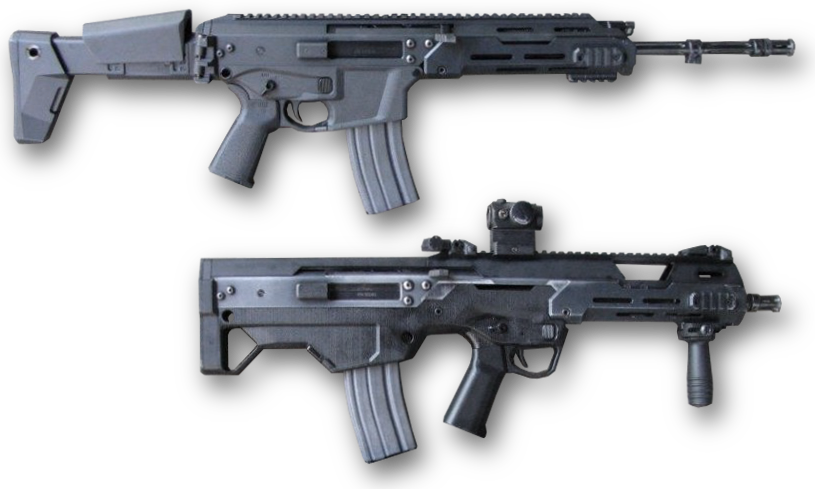
- Grot C16 FB-M1 (top) and Grot B16 FB-M1 (bottom)
- Type: Assault rifle (MSBS Grot C); Bullpup assault rifle (MSBS Grot B)
- Place of origin: Poland

Service history
- Used by: See Users
- Wars: Russo-Ukrainian War; Russian invasion of Ukraine; M23 campaign

Production history
- Designer: Adam Gawron, Bartosz Stefaniak, Grzegorz Misiołek, Maciej Sajdak
- Designed: 2007
- Manufacturer: FB "Łucznik" Radom
- Produced: 2007–2017 (prototypes); 2018–present
- Variants: See Variants

Specifications
- Mass: 3.7 kg (8.2 lb) (Grot C); 3.4 kg (7.5 lb) (Grot B)
- Length: 980 mm (39 in) (Grot C, stock extended); 720 mm (28 in) (Grot B)
- Barrel length: 254 mm (10.0 in); 406 mm (16.0 in); 508 mm (20.0 in); 267 mm (10.5 in) (Grot S); 368 mm (14.5 in) (Grot S)
- Width: 65 mm (2.6 in)
- Cartridge: 5.56×45mm NATO; 7.62×39mm
- Action: Short-stroke gas piston, rotating bolt
- Rate of fire: 700–900 rounds/min
- Muzzle velocity: 890 m/s (2,900 ft/s)
- Effective firing range: 500–800 m (547–875 yd)
- Feed system: 30-round detachable 5.56×45mm NATO and 7.62×39mm STANAG box magazines, 60-round casket magazine
- Sights: Integrated Picatinny rail for various optical sights and Picatinny attachable iron sights

The MSBS Grot (Polish: Modułowy System Broni Strzeleckiej „Grot”, English: Modular Firearm System "Grot") is a family of modular assault rifles developed and manufactured by FB "Łucznik" Radom. Early prototypes were known as the MSBS Radon.

The MSBS Grot was developed in two different configurations: MSBS Grot C (conventional design) and MSBS Grot B (bullpup design). Both configurations use the same locking mechanism, and the modular structure ensures interchangeability of parts and accessories. The MSBS Grot is intended to ultimately replace the FB Beryl as the Polish service rifle.

The MSBS-7.62N project began in late 2015, a designated marksman rifle variant based on the MSBS Grot, and was later designated as the Grot 762N.

== History ==
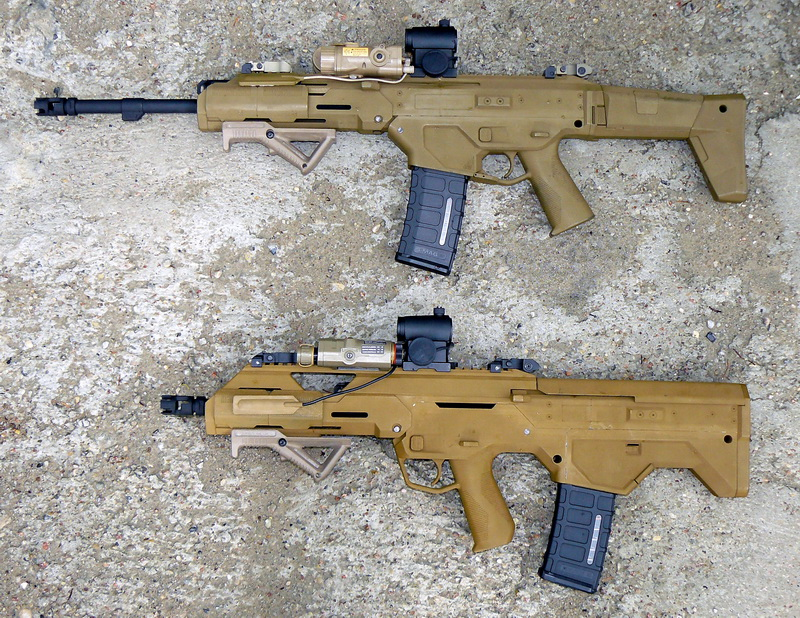
Prototypes of the MSBS-5.56 during the development stage in 2011 in both the conventional and bullpup layout

The MSBS program was in development since 2007 by the Military University of Technology (WAT) in Warsaw with cooperation from the firearms manufacturer Fabryka Broni Radom, and was designed to replace the FB Beryl as the standard-issue service rifle of the Polish Armed Forces.

During initial tests conducted by the Military University of Technology, the MSBS-5.56 and its counterpart Heckler & Koch HK416 were subjected to comparative testing of the barrel and hand-guard for overheating during an intensive firing schedule. According to the tests, MSBS yielded the better results of the two rifles despite having a relatively light and longer barrel profile. Additional tests have also shown that MSBS is less susceptible to jamming when using lower quality ammunition or when it is insufficiently maintained, and had a more manageable recoil when fired in fully automatic compared to other assault rifles chambered in the 5.56 cartridge, such as FB Beryl, HK416, FN SCAR-L or CZ BREN 2.

One of the main design characteristics of the MSBS-5.56 is the modular weapon system. If necessary, a soldier can sacrifice, for example, one standard assault rifle to quickly repair a light machine gun during a firefight. Another feature of the MSBS Grot is barrel changeability, as found on the Steyr AUG. This means a soldier may be able to adapt their rifle based on the environment they are in, such as converting a carbine to a designated marksman rifle, in order to engage targets at a greater range. The benefits of this feature allow an infantry squad to have fewer specialised weapons. MSBS may also be used with components other than the ones manufactured domestically, and it is the first Polish rifle fully compliant with the NATO standards. The MSBS-5.56 features fully ambidextrous controls and Picatinny rail, and it may also be fed from standard STANAG magazines.

Currently, the MSBS Grot is in service with the Polish Territorial Defence Forces and is scheduled to replace the FB Beryl as the primary infantry weapon and service rifle of the Polish Armed Forces. Following the adoption of the MSBS-5.56 by the Polish military, the Grot moniker has been added to the MSBS name in honour of the Home Army commander, General Stefan "Grot" Rowecki. The literal translation of the Polish word Grot is “arrowhead” or “spearhead”.

During the 2022 Russian invasion of Ukraine 10,000 Grot C16A2s were sent to the Ukrainian military.

On May 9, 2022, the public was informed about the conclusion of an agreement between the Polish Armaments Group and an undefined East African country for the supply of an unspecified number of MSBS Grot assault rifles chambered for 7.62×39mm rounds as specified by the customer, along with 40 mm grenade launchers and optical sights DCM-1 Szafir manufactured by PCO S.A.

In January 2025, a photo appeared on the X website (formerly Twitter) showing small arms captured by soldiers of the Democratic Republic of the Congo from M23 rebels, amongst them is an MSBS Grot C chambered in 7.62×39mm cartridge.

On 11 December 2025, FB Radom announced that the MSBS GROT Pistol had received certification from the U.S. Bureau of Alcohol, Tobacco, Firearms and Explosives (ATF), authorizing its import and sale on the United States civilian market under the requirements of the Gun Control Act of 1968. The certification covered three barrel variants, and the rifle was to be distributed in the United States by Arms of America.

== Design details ==
The MSBS Grot is a selective fire modular assault rifle which is capable of semi-automatic, 3-round burst and fully automatic fire. It has a cyclic rate of fire of around 700–900 rounds per minute.

The MSBS-5.56 features fully ambidextrous controls and Picatinny rail, and it may also be fed from standard STANAG magazines.

=== Modularity ===
Both the MSBS Grot C and MSBS Grot B are planned in 5 different configurations and have many common interchangeable parts and can be converted from one to the other:

Configuration	Explanation
Assault rifle	Standard assault rifle configuration with 16 in (410 mm) barrel.
Assault rifle with underbarrel grenade launcher	Similar to the assault rifle configuration but with a 40×46mm underbarrel grenade launcher equipped.
Carbine	Short barrel variant with a 10 in (250 mm) barrel.
Carbine with underbarrel grenade launcher	Similar to the carbine configuration but with a 40×46mm underbarrel grenade launcher equipped.
Machine gun	Essentially an automatic rifle variant for both Grot C and Grot B. It features a heavier barrel fitted with a flash hider, and the bayonet-mount was removed. This variant is meant to be used with high-capacity magazines. Surefire MAG5-60 were used for demonstration purposes.
Designated marksman rifle	DMR variant fitted with a lighter and more precise 16 in (410 mm) and 20 in (508 mm) barrel, and has a two-stage trigger group.

The MSBS Grot B, and the machine gun and designated marksman rifle configurations are not yet produced. Conversion kits between variants are also not yet available. Conversion kit to change the calibre to 7.62×39mm is available.

==== Polish military adoption ====
Since the Polish ministry of defence ordered 53,000 of the MSBS assault rifles, Fabryka Broni has introduced a military naming designation for the MSBS series.

Following the adoption of the MSBS-5.56 by the Polish military, the Grot moniker has been added to the MSBS name in honor of the Home Army commander, General Stefan "Grot" Rowecki.

Term	Explanation
Grot	After the official adoption of the MSBS-5.56 by the Polish Armed Forces, the Grot name was added.
C, B, R, S	Variants: classic, bullpup, representative, sport (semi-auto civilian). Denoted after the Grot designation.
10, 14, 16, 20	Nominal barrel-length designations, in inches. Depending on the variant, actual marketed or adopted barrel lengths include approximately 10.5, 14.5 and 16 inches. In 2026 the Polish Armed Forces ordered the C14 FB-M1 A3 with a 14.5-inch barrel.
C, G, M, PS	Configurations: carbine, variants with grenade launcher, automatic rifle, designated marksman rifle. Denoted after the barrel length designation.
FB	Fabryka Broni, the manufacturer of this weapon system.
A0–A3	Successive modification configurations of the Grot. These designations are separate from the manufacturer's FB-M1 element of the full model designation; for example, the 2026 military variant is designated C14 FB-M1 A3.

=== Further development ===
The M2 was developed to address the issues found on the early production models. The bullpup configuration did not receive the M2 upgrade due to the lack of interest from the Polish military.

The changes included a longer upper receiver with M-LOK compatible handguard and heat stop covers, a quick-detach sling mounting points, FB made pistol grip instead of previous Magpul pistol grip due to shortage during mass production, reinforced buttstock, reinforced secondary sights, strengthened, thicker charging handle, reinforced firing pin (not interchangeable with the old one from M1), FB made polymer translucent magazine, new lock (not interchangeable with the old one from M1), and new slide (not interchangeable with the old one from M1).

== Variants ==
The following variants were designed based on the requests from the Polish Armed Forces to replace currently used firearms such as the AKM, FB Beryl, FB Mini-Beryl, and Pallad grenade launcher.

=== MSBS Grot C ===
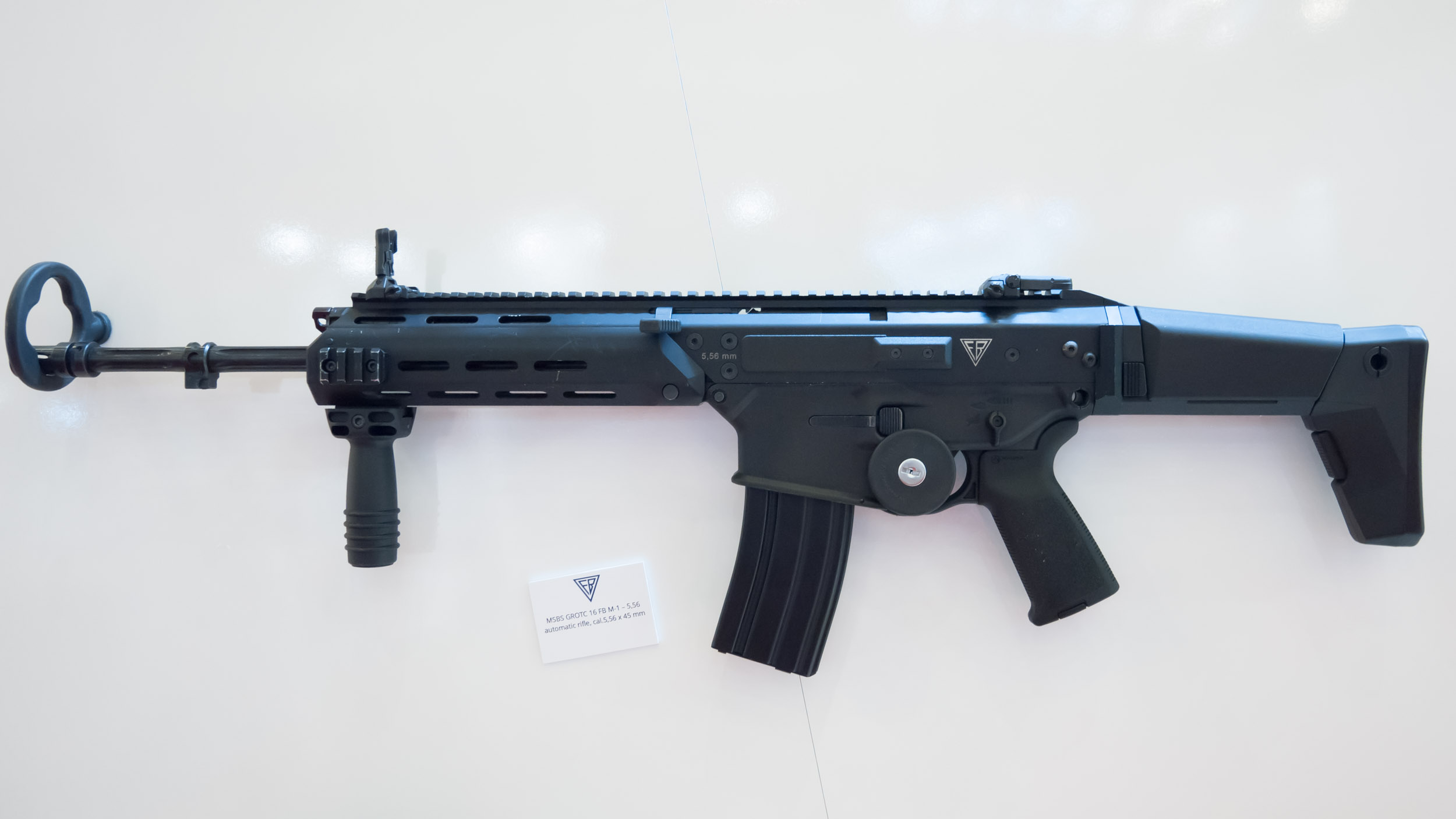
MSBS Grot C16 FB-M1 with a vertical foregrip

The MSBS Grot C (Polish: klasyczny) is the classic configuration of the MSBS-5.56, chambered in either 5.56×45mm NATO or 7.62×39mm cartridge with a folding and retractable stock.

==== MSBS Grot A0 ====
1,000 units were produced in the initial production of the MSBS-5,56 A0.

==== MSBS Grot A1 ====
First production batch, also known as the “MSBS-5,56 A1“: modified charging handle and additional strap mount point on the picatinny rail.

==== MSBS Grot A2 ====
Second production batch, also known as the MSBS-5,56 A2: longer handguard to cover the gas block, reinforced firing pin for dry fire practice, improved pistol grip and buttstock.

==== MSBS Grot A3 ====
The MSBS Grot A3 was publicly presented at the Grotowisko 2024 small-arms conference, held in Zegrze from 22 to 23 June 2024. The prototype incorporated changes developed on the basis of feedback from users of earlier Grot variants and experience gained during combat use in Ukraine.

On 10 June 2026, the head of the Polish Armament Agency approved the technical documentation for the A3, completing the development stage and allowing the variant to enter production for the Polish Armed Forces.

Compared with earlier configurations, the A3 introduced changes to the stock and its mounting, magazine well, muzzle device, gas system, handguard and accessory rails, as well as changes intended to improve corrosion resistance. The gas-regulator retaining system and the piston/push-rod assembly were also redesigned, allowing the latter to be removed forward after removal of the regulator.

Combat use in Ukraine provided additional feedback on the platform. Reports described good accuracy and ergonomics as strengths of the rifle, while also identifying areas for further improvement, including overall weight when fitted with optics and accessories and the durability or operation of some components of earlier production configurations.

The A3 incorporated a number of changes consistent with those operational lessons, including a shorter 14.5-inch barrel in the C14 variant, a redesigned stock mounting system and handguard, modifications to the gas system and efforts to reduce weight and improve durability and corrosion resistance.

On 24 June 2026, the Armament Agency and Fabryka Broni signed the first production contract for the A3 variant. The contract covers approximately 46,000 MSBS GROT C14 FB-M1 A3 rifles with 14.5-inch barrels, worth nearly PLN 600 million, with deliveries scheduled for 2026–2027.

==== MSBS Grot R ====
The MSBS Grot R (Representative) is a manual repeating rifle variant of the MSBS Grot designed to be used as a ceremonial rifle by the Representative Honor Guard Regiment of the Polish Armed Forces, which has been adapted to fire blanks and withstand drills. With the modularity of the MSBS Grot, the barrel can be swapped to fire live ammunition.

==== MSBS Grot S ====
The MSBS Grot S is a civilian semi-automatic only variant of the MSBS Grot that lacks the bayonet-mount, and is available in 4 different barrel lengths for the .223 Remington: 10.5-, 14.5-, and 16-inch and only in 16-inch for the 7.62×39mm.

=== MSBS Grot B ===
The MSBS Grot B (Polish: bezkolbowy) is similar to the MSBS Grot C but in bullpup configuration.

The MSBS Grot was designed to share a universal upper receiver for both the classic and bullpup configurations, which leads to the ease of conversion by simply swapping the lower receiver.

=== Grot 762N ===
The Grot 762N is a semi-automatic designated marksman rifle chambered in 7.62×51mm NATO cartridge, developed from the MSBS Grot.

On 24 February 2023, the Polish Armed Forces ordered 250 Grot 762N rifles chambered in 7.62×51mm NATO. The contract was worth more than PLN 11 million gross.

== Users ==
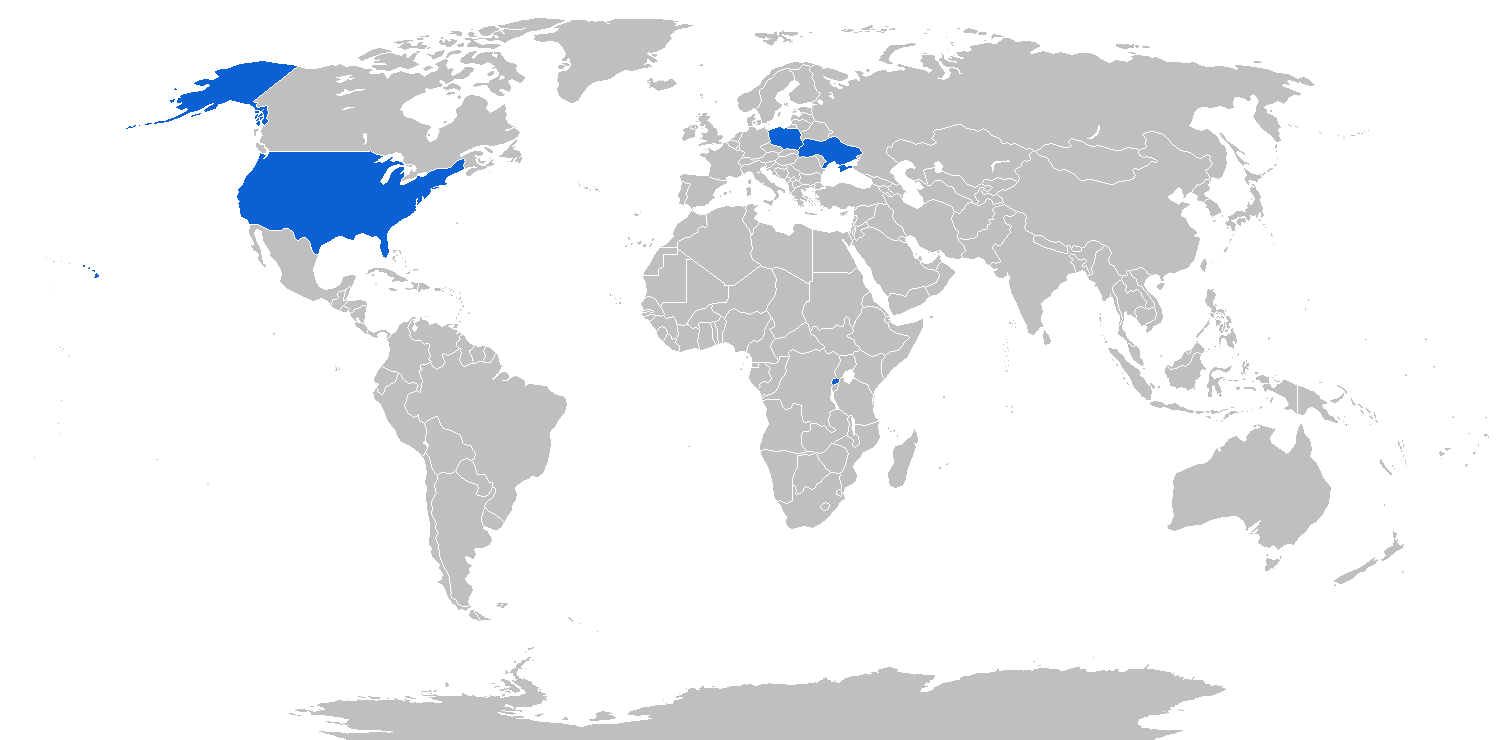
Operators of the MSBS Grot

- Poland:
  - Polish Armed Forces – large-scale procurement has continued since the initial 2017 order. On 2 January 2023, an annex to the 8 July 2020 contract increased the order by nearly 70,000 rifles for approximately PLN 826 million gross. On 24 February 2023, a further contract covered 88,000 Grot rifles, alongside an order for 250 Grot 762N designated marksman rifles. In December 2024, the Armament Agency ordered approximately 45,000 additional MSBS GROT C16 FB-A2 rifles as part of a contract also covering VIS 100 pistols and 40 mm under-barrel grenade launchers. On 2 September 2025, another contract worth PLN 307 million was signed for approximately 23,000 rifles, with deliveries scheduled for 2027–2028. At that time the Ministry of National Defence reported that approximately 230,000 Grot rifle sets had already been contracted under earlier agreements, of which approximately 160,000 had been delivered; including the new order, the total number delivered or on order exceeded 250,000. In June 2026, a further approximately 46,000 C14 FB-M1 A3 rifles were ordered for delivery in 2026–2027.
  - Territorial Defence Force, 53,000 in 2017.
- Rwanda: In 2022–2023, Polish defence-industry companies announced export contracts for MSBS Grot rifles with undisclosed East-Central African customers. In 2024, photographs published online showed a soldier of the Rwandan Special Operations Force carrying a 7.62×39mm MSBS Grot fitted with a 40 mm GP under-barrel grenade launcher.
- Ukraine: 10,000 Grot C16 FB-M1 and -M2 variants were donated to the Ukrainian Armed Forces during the 2022 Russian invasion of Ukraine. In 2023, it was announced that an unspecified number of Grot C16 M2 variants had been ordered by Ukraine, but later on such claims have been denied.
- United States: Unknown quantity sold to Special Operations Command (USSOCOM).

=== Non-state users ===
- March 23 Movement
- Ingush Liberation Army

== See also ==
- Adaptive Combat Rifle
- Beretta ARX160
- SIG MCX

== Sources ==
- (in Polish) Pierwszy pokaz MSBS-5,56 in: Altair, 12 December 2009
- (in Polish) Nowa polska broń – MSBS-5,56 in: Altair, 15 December 2009
- (in Polish) MSBS-5,56 już strzela in: Altair, 16 December 2009
- (in Polish) Rodzina MSBS-5.56 W Czerwcu in: Altair, 22 March 2010
- (in Polish) Nowy MSBS-5,56 in: Altair, 9 August 2010
- (in Polish) MSBS-5,56 w nowej szacie in: Altair, 5 October 2010
- (in Polish) Giwera przyszłości in: Polska zbrojna, 30 December 2008
- (in Polish) MSBS-5,56 w Pułtusku in: Altair, 4 June 2011
- (in Polish) MSBS do amunicji 7,62mm x 39 in: Altair, 21 September 2014
- (in Polish) Prototypy karabinów MSBS-7,62 na MSPO in Altair, 9 January 2016
- (in English) Complete family of MSBS-5,56 rifles 5, June 2018
