= SPAP =

SPAP may refer to:

- Piraeus, Athens and Peloponnese Railways (Siderodromi Pireos Athinon Peloponisou), a meter-gauge railway network in southern Greece
- Samodzielny Pododdział Antyterrorystyczny Policji or Independent Counter-terrorism Police Subdivision, independent anti-terrorist police subunits of the Polish police
- Seaport-Airport Road, a proposed highway to Cochin International Airport, Kerala, India
- Secure Password Authentication Protocol
- Shiva Password Authentication Protocol
- Socialist Popular Alliance Party, Egypt
- Sodium-proton antiporter
- State Prescription Assistance Program, a social program prescription assistance offered in U.S. states as part of Medicaid
- Systolic pulmonary artery pressure (sPAP); see pulmonary hypertension
