= FB Onyks =

Skbk wz. 1989 Onyks
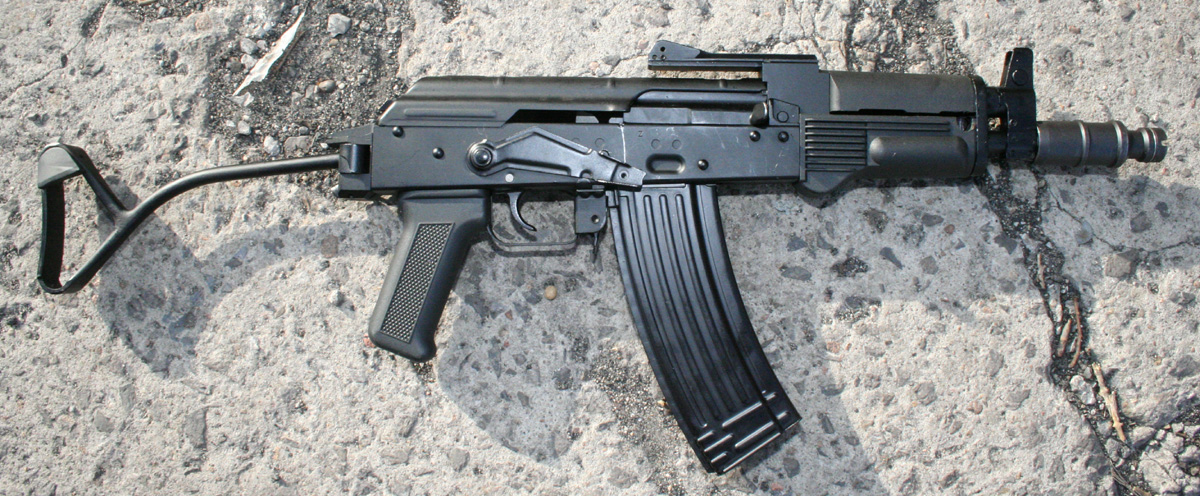
- The wz. 89 Onyks carbine
- Type: Carbine
- Place of origin: Poland

Service history
- In service: Never fully entered service
- Used by: SPAP (formerly)

Production history
- Designer: K. Styczyński, E. Wysocki
- Designed: 1987–1990
- Manufacturer: FB "Łucznik" Radom
- No. built: 200

Specifications
- Mass: 3.22 kg (7.10 lb)
- Length: 720 mm (28.3 in) stock extended / 519 mm (20.4 in) stock folded
- Barrel length: 207 mm (8.1 in)
- Cartridge: 5.45×39mm
- Action: Gas-operated, rotating bolt
- Rate of fire: 700 rounds/min
- Muzzle velocity: 700 m/s (2,297 ft/s)
- Effective firing range: 100–400 m sight adjustments
- Feed system: 30-round detachable box magazine
- Sights: Flip rear sight and front post; 223 mm (8.8 in) sight radius

The 5.45 mm subkarabinek wz. 1989 Onyks (polish for: subcarbine wz. 1989 Onyx) is a lightweight Polish short variant of the 5.45 mm wz. 1988 Tantal assault rifle, also based on the AKS-74U. Work on the weapon began in 1989 at the Ośrodek Badawczo-Rozwojowy state research institute in the city of Radom. The weapon's technical specifications were confirmed that same year. It was not until 1990 that production approval was given for the first prototypes, evaluated the following year in a series of military qualification tests resulting in an order for an initial pre-production batch in 1993, to be manufactured at the Łucznik Arms Factory in Radom.

The carbine was created by a team led by B. Szpaderski and its chief engineers were K. Styczyński and E. Wysocki. The Onyks remained a prototype and has never advanced past the research and development stage. The Onyks was designed to equip airborne infantry, police and military special operations units and vehicle crews.

== Design details ==
The carbine has an identical design layout, system of operation, locking mechanism and uses the same type of ammunition as the Tantal rifle, and the main modifications include the following components: the barrel, bolt carrier and piston rod, gas cylinder, foregrip, heatguard, muzzle device and iron sights.

Compared to the Tantal, the Onyks features a barrel reduced in length by 216 mm (8.5 in), fitted with a different type of muzzle device. Due to the barrel's length, this device is primarily used to reduce muzzle flash, but it can also be used to mount and launch rifle grenades. At its muzzle end, the device has a conical flash hider, and on its tapered, external surface – a retainer spring and two collars, used to attach and guide rifle grenades.

The Onyks features a bolt carrier borrowed from the wz. 1988 rifle, but with a significantly shortened gas piston rod. Additionally both the gas cylinder and upper heatguard have been reduced to accommodate the short gas system.

The carbine also has a different sighting arrangement than the Tantal rifle, with a newly designed rear sight. The open-type flip sight with both 100-200 and 400 m settings is installed at the rear of an extended sight rail protected by ears, which is riveted to the rear sight base. The sight has two settings, “1 i 2” and “4” (that correspond to firing ranges from 100 to 200 m and 400 m respectively). The flip sight locks in position with a spring detent. The adjustable front sight post is screwed into the front sight base that is installed in the gas block. The Onyks can be fitted with tritium night sights, similar to those used in the wz. 88 Tantal. Recesses cut into both sides of the sight rail are used to mount optical sights.

The wooden or synthetic handguard, designed specifically for the Onyks is installed in a way analogous to the Tantal rifle's handguard.

The carbine is supplied with three spare magazines, four 15-round stripper clips and a magazine guide, cleaning kit, cleaning rod (which is stored in the maintenance kit, unlike the Tantal – under the barrel), sling, accessory pouch and oil bottle. Also unlike the Tantal, the Onyks is not compatible with a bayonet, bipod or the 40 mm wz. 1974 underslung grenade launcher.

== Users ==
- Poland: Formerly used by SPAP.

== See also ==
- FB "Łucznik" Radom
