= FB Mini-Beryl =

kbk wz. 96 Mini-Beryl
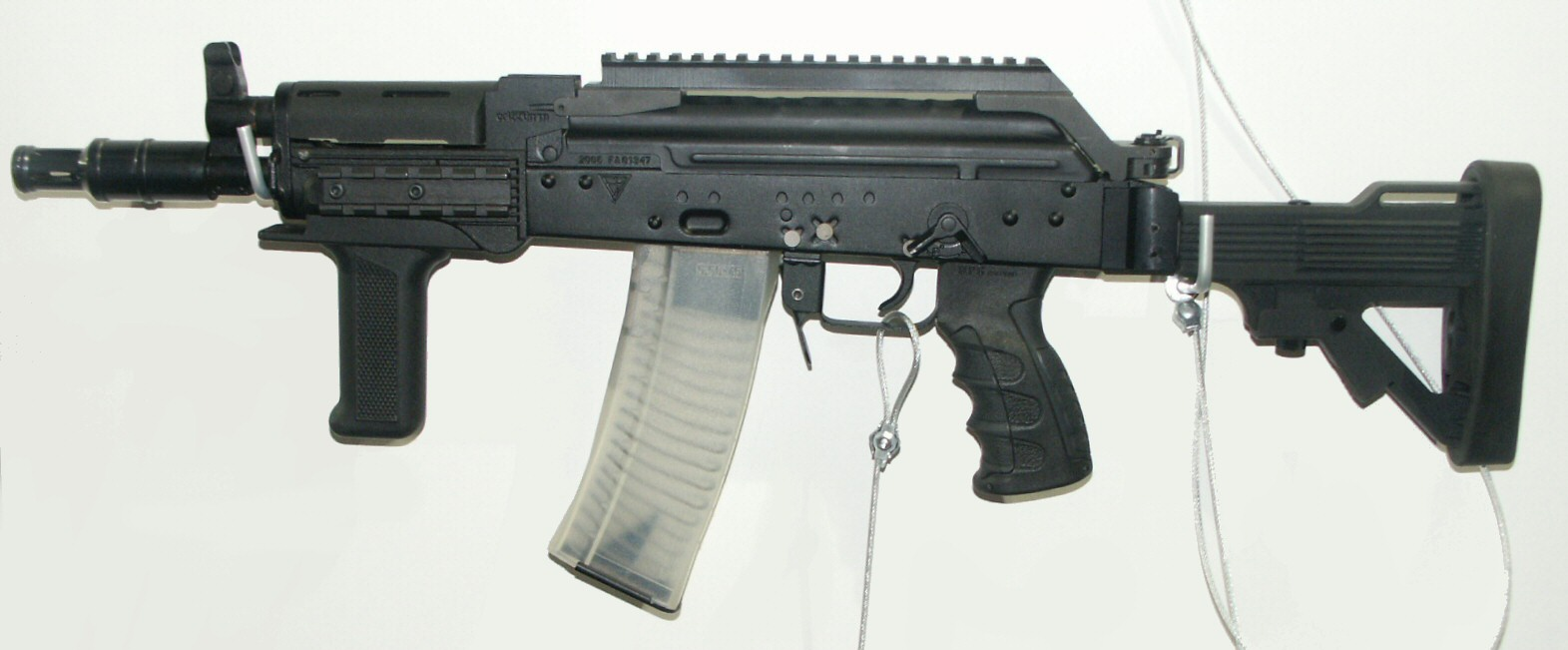
- The Mini-Beryl with a long receiver MIL-STD-1913 rail, vertical grip and telescopic stock.
- Type: Assault rifle, carbine
- Place of origin: Poland

Service history
- In service: 1997–present
- Used by: See Users
- Wars: War in Afghanistan; EUFOR Tchad

Production history
- Designed: 1995–1996
- Manufacturer: FB Radom
- Produced: 1997–present

Specifications
- Mass: 3.0 kg (6.61 lb) (without magazine)
- Length: 730 mm (28.7 in) stock extended / 525 mm (20.7 in) stock folded
- Barrel length: 235 mm (9.3 in)
- Caliber: 5.56×45mm NATO
- Action: Gas-operated, rotating bolt
- Rate of fire: 700 rounds/min
- Muzzle velocity: 770 m/s (2,526 ft/s)
- Effective firing range: 100–1,000 m sight adjustments
- Feed system: 20-/30-round box magazine
- Sights: Rear: sliding notch on ramp; Front: sight post with tritium insert; (225 mm (8.9 in) sight radius)

The FB Mini-Beryl is a Polish compact assault rifle (carbine) derived from the FB Beryl service rifle and chambered for 5.56×45mm. It was developed in parallel with the wz. 96 Beryl by the Fabryka Broni in Radom and introduced into service with the Polish Armed Forces in 1997 under the military designation karabinek krótki wz. 96 (abbreviated kbk wz. 96, "short carbine pattern 1996").

== Design ==
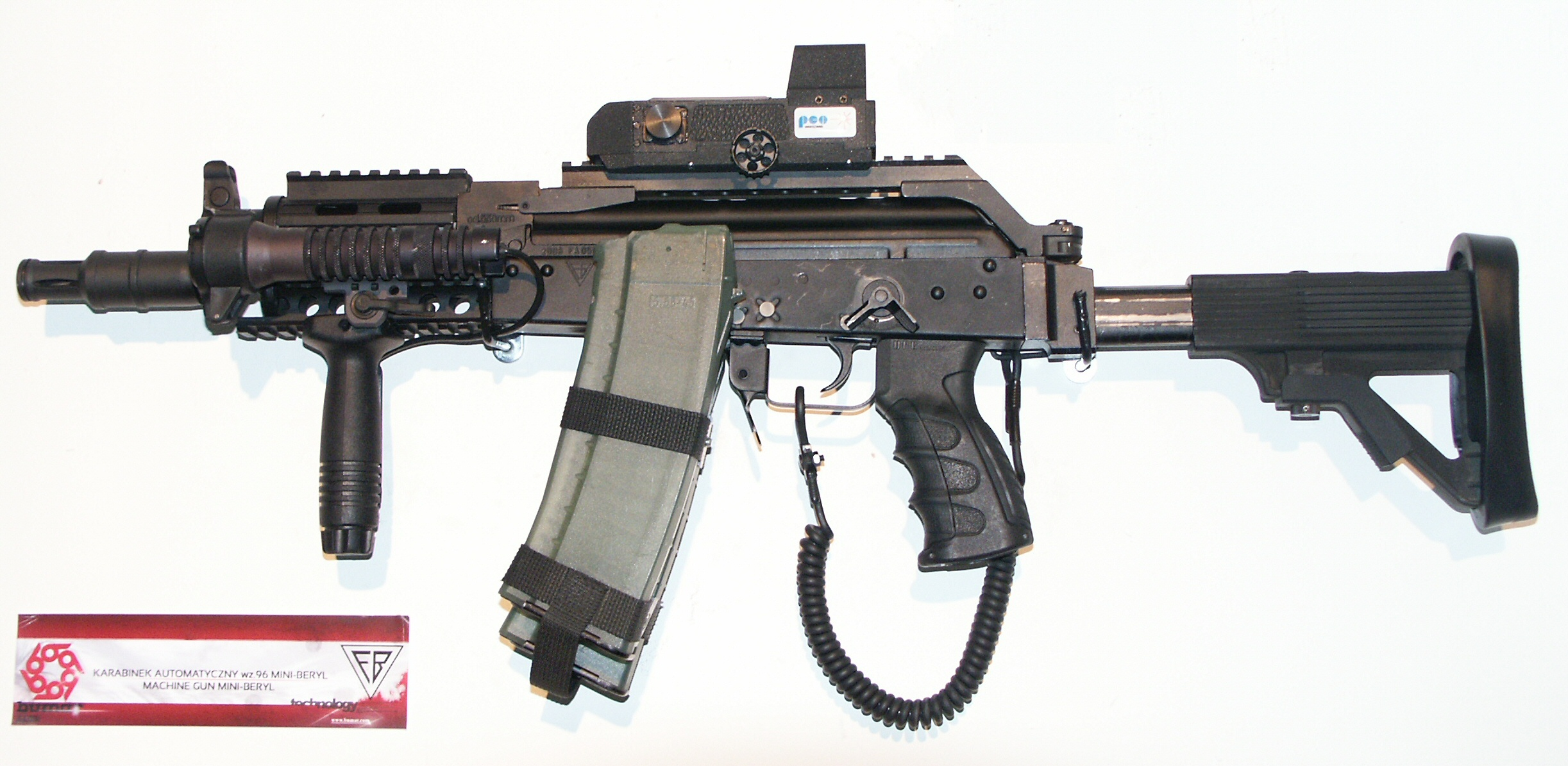
Mini Beryl carbine

The Mini-Beryl's design combines features from both the FB Onyks carbine and the FB Beryl rifle; the principal components that were modified include the barrel, barrel trunnion, upper and lower handguards, muzzle device and magazine. The weapon's method of operation, the rotary bolt locking mechanism and ammunition are identical to those of the wz. 1996 Beryl standard rifle.

The 235 mm (9.3 in) barrel has 6 right-hand grooves and a rifling twist rate of 1 in 228 mm (1:9 in) capable of firing both SS109 and M193 types of 5.56×45mm ammunition with optimum performance from both. The barrel's profile is nearly identical to the barrel of the wz. 89 Onyks carbine, it is however slightly longer to accommodate the modified gas block.

The muzzle device, externally similar to the muzzle attachment of the wz. 89 Onyks in appearance, has deeper-seated threading used to screw the flash suppressor into the gas block (it has a lower volume decompression compartment). The compensator has two symmetrical ports at the muzzle end of the device placed at a 90° angle in relation to each other. The muzzle attachment can also be used to fire rifle grenades to ranges up to 150 meters.

The magazine developed for the Mini-Beryl is shorter compared to the standard magazine of the Beryl and has a smaller capacity (20 rounds). Standard magazines from the Beryl can also be used. New magazines are molded from a translucent polymer allowing the shooter to visually monitor the level of ammunition.

The base of the rear sight – unlike in the Onyks – has cut-outs on its top surface running alongside it and used to mount a variety of optical sights or a Picatinny-type rail adapter. A variant of the Mini-Beryl is also offered with a MIL-STD-1913 Picatinny rail instead of the standard rear sight; a simple auxiliary rear sight is built into the rail. The standard rear sight and front post are provided with luminescent dots to assist aiming in poor light conditions.

The weapon's gas block is longer than that of the Onyks and it features internal threading that is used to secure the muzzle device in place.

The Mini-Beryl has a twin-strut stock folding to the right-hand side of the receiver; the butt-plate is rubber. All furniture is high-impact black plastic. The handguards were developed specifically for the carbine.

The carbine's bolt carrier and piston rod, gas cylinder, upper handguard and sighting system are identical to those used in the wz. 1989 Onyks, similarly, the receiver housing, dust cover trigger group and magazine are the same as those in the wz. 1996 Beryl.

Standard equipment supplied with carbine includes three spare magazines (including one 20-round short magazine), four 15-round stripper clips, a stripper clip magazine guide, maintenance kit, cleaning rod (carried in the accessory pouch), sling, magazine and accessory pouch and oil bottle. The carbine can also be fitted with two side rails secured to the lower handguard (used to attach tactical accessories and illumination devices), a vertical forward grip and a blank-firing muzzle attachment.

== Users ==
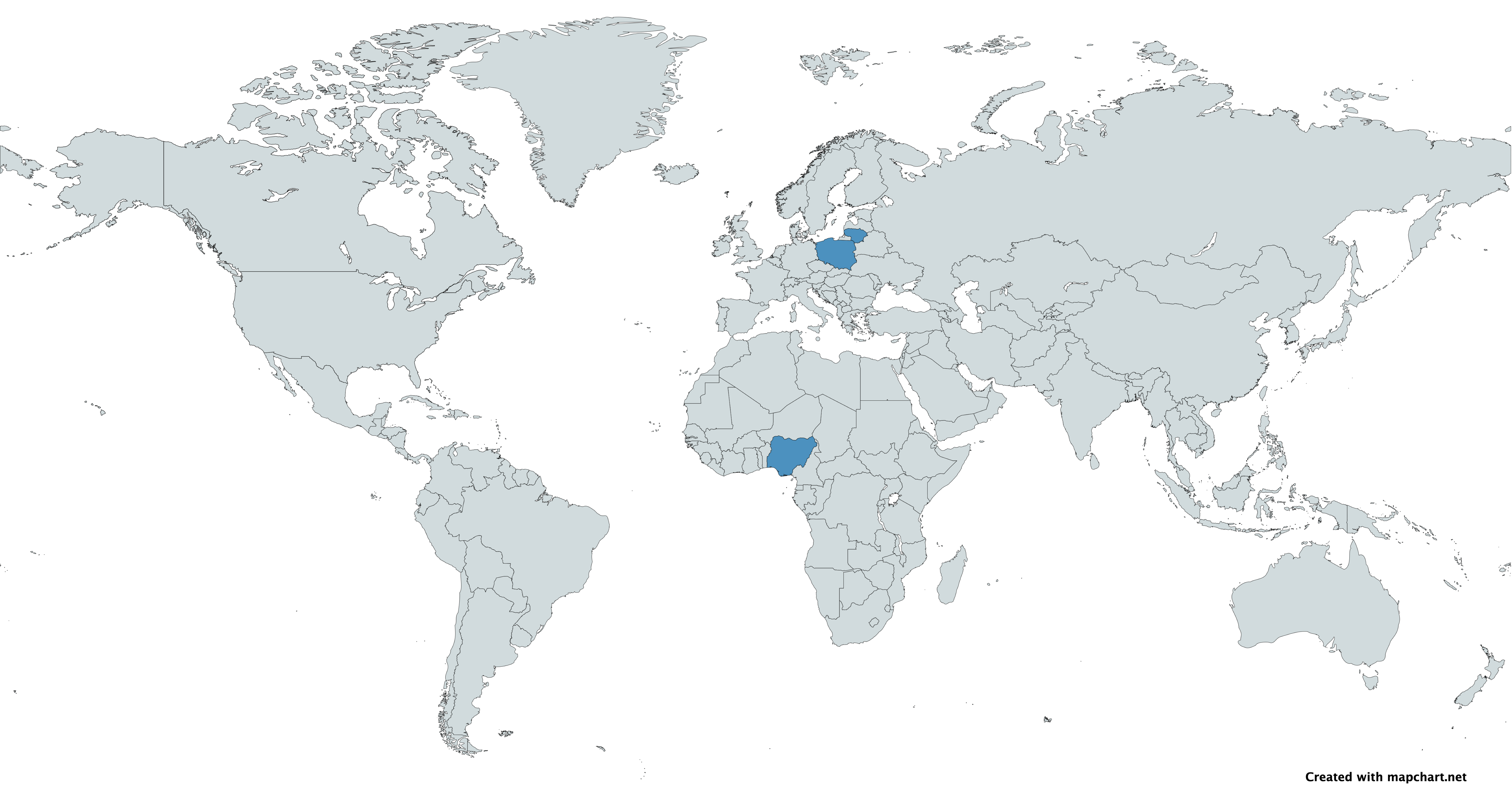
Map with FB Mini-Beryl users in blue

- Poland – secured contract for 8,000 Beryl Mod. 96 5.56 mm assault rifles and Mod. 96 Mini Beryl rifles to the Polish military.
- Lithuania – 10 units in use (wz. 1996A)
- Nigeria – 10 test units (wz. 1996C).

== See also ==
- AM-17 – 490mm when folded
- AKS-74U – 490mm when folded
- FB Onyks – 519mm when folded
- FN SCAR PDW – 536mm when stock retracted
- Heckler & Koch G36C – 500mm when folded
- SIG MCX Rattler – 432mm when folded
- FB "Łucznik" Radom
