= FB "Łucznik" Radom =

Polish firearms manufacturer

Fabryka Broni „Łucznik” – Radom Sp. z o.o.
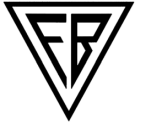
- Type: Subsidiary
- Industry: Arms industry
- Founded: 1922
- Headquarters: ul. Aleksego Grobickiego 23, Radom, Poland
- Key people: Adam Suliga (CEO); Maciej Borecki
- Products: Firearms
- Total equity: 89.618 million zł
- Parent: Polska Grupa Zbrojeniowa
- Website: fabrykabroni.pl

Fabryka Broni "Łucznik" – Radom (Polish: [ˈwutʂnik]), commonly known as FB Radom or simply Łucznik, is a Polish defence industry enterprise from Radom that produces firearms. The enterprise is part of the Polska Grupa Zbrojeniowa.

In the past, the factory also produced non-military equipment, most notably sewing machines and typewriters. Typewriters were deemed unprofitable and dropped. The production of sewing machines was taken over by a company established in the 1999 restructuring, going by the same name Łucznik.

== History ==
The company was founded in the Second Polish Republic to produce firearms for the Polish Armed Forces.

In 1925, the main building, steel hardening shop, power plant, boiler room, woodshop, bath, and the workers’ houses were erected. On 31 December 1927, production was launched when, by an act signed by then Director of the plant Msc.Eng. Kazimierz Ołdakowski, the plant was officially taken over from the local government and became part of the Państwowe Wytwórnie Uzbrojenia concern. Ołdakowski insisted that his workers received free health care. He also arranged for child care services and regular leisure time, and built gymnasiums, theaters, gardens and housing for his workers. During his directorship, the Vis pistol (military designation pistolet wz. 35) was developed.

During World War II, the factory was taken over by the Germans and continued arms production for the Wehrmacht.

After World War II, Fabryka Broni was renamed Zakłady Metalowe im. gen. "Waltera" (General Walter Metal Works). It received the factory code number of 11; to prevent confusion with an earlier Factory #11, the number received a single circle around it to differentiate it. In 1990, the factory returned to its old name Zakłady Metalowe "Łucznik" (Metal Works "Łucznik"), "łucznik" meaning 'archer'. It became a state-owned company. On 13 November 2000, the company was declared bankrupt, however, on 30 June 2000 a company Fabryka Broni "Łucznik" – Radom (Arms Factory Łucznik – Radom) was created by ZM Łucznik and the Industry Development Agency which took over arms production.

== Products ==
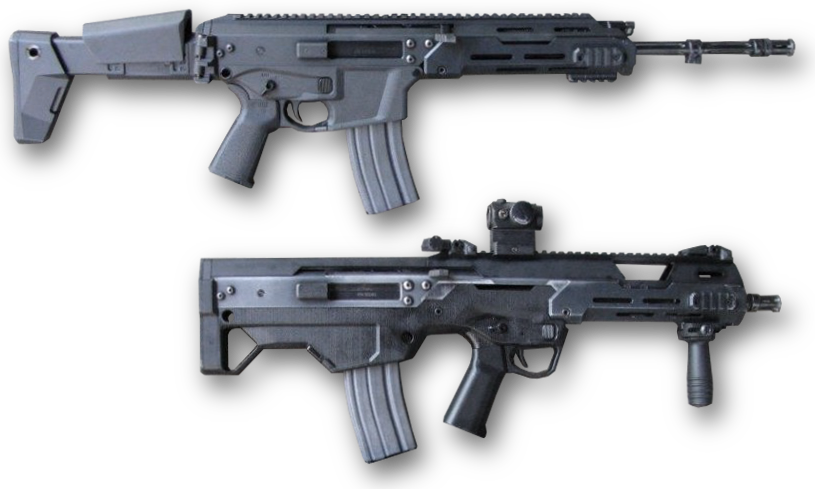
MSBS assault rifle variant in conventional and bullpup configurations

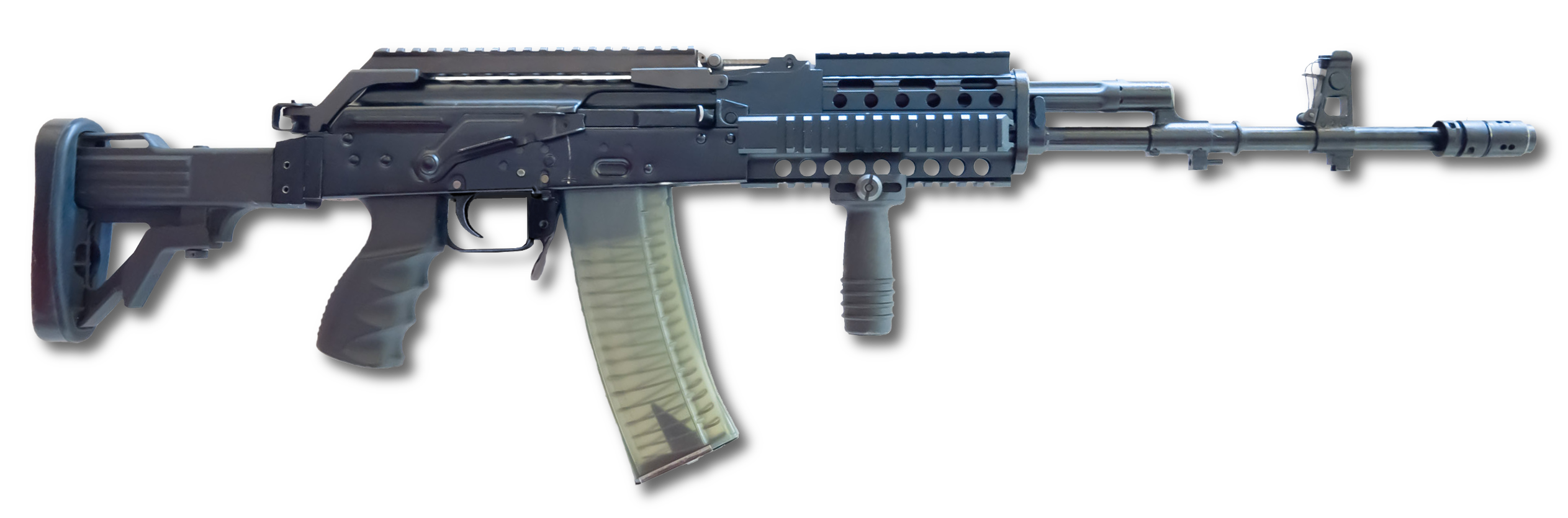
Beryl assault rifle

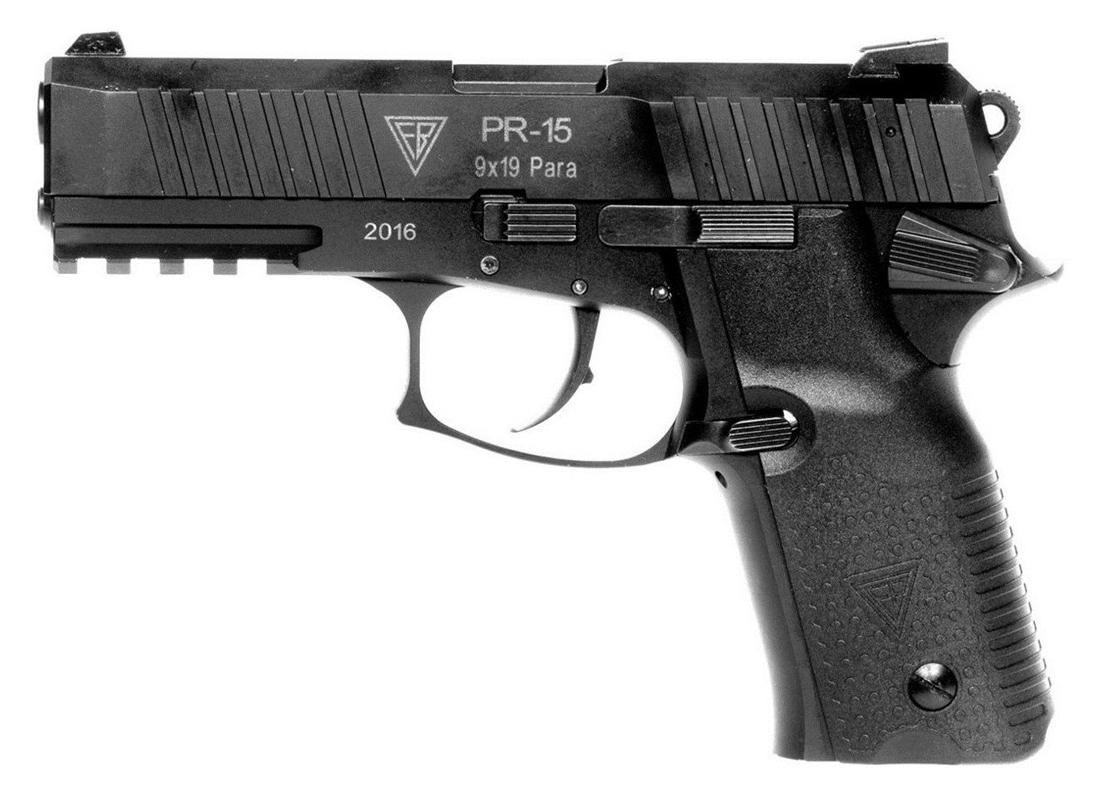
VIS 100 semi-automatic pistol

=== Original designs ===
- FB MSBS – 5.56 mm/7.62 mm modular firearm system (assault rifle and marksman rifle in production), adopted by Polish Armed Forces as Grot
- FB Beryl – 5.56 mm assault rifle (in production), standard-issue service rifle of the Polish Armed Forces
- FB Mini-Beryl – 5.56 mm carbine (in production)
- FB Onyks – 5.45 mm carbine
- FB Tantal – 5.45 mm assault rifle
- Radom Hunter – AKM derivative for civilian market
- FB Glauberyt – 9 mm submachine gun (in production)
- FB PM-63 – 9 mm Makarov submachine gun
- FB VIS 100 – 9 mm pistol
- FB MPS – 9 mm pistol (in development)
- FB MAG – 9 mm pistol
- FB Wanad – 9 mm Makarov pistol
- FB P-64 – 9 mm Makarov pistol
- FB VIS – 9 mm pistol
- wz. 44 – 26.5mm flare pistol
- wz. 78 – 26.5mm flare pistol

=== Licensed weapons ===
- Walther PPS pistol (in production)
- Walther P99 pistol (in production)
- Mosin–Nagant (1951–1955)
- pw wz. 33 (1947–1956) 7,62x25mm TT-33 pistol
- PPSh-41 (1951–1953?)
- PPS-43 and PPS-43/52 (1951–1955)
- AK-47 and AKM (1957–1992, 1997–2000)
- DP-28 and DPM (1952–1955)
- RPD (1958–1961)
- kbk wz. 29 (1930–1939) Gewehr 98 derivative
- kb wz. 98a (1936–1939) Gewehr 98 derivative

== See also ==
- Państwowa Fabryka Karabinów
