= Kbkg wz. 1960 =

Karabinek-granatnik wz.1960
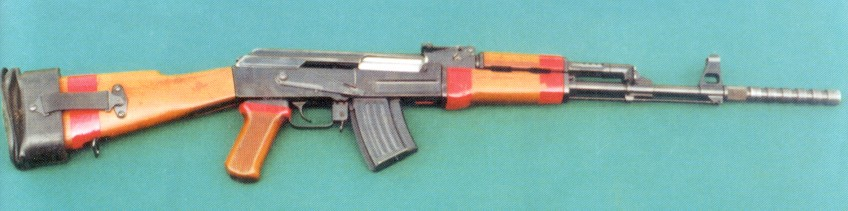
- The Karabinek-granatnik wz.1960
- Type: Assault rifle-grenade launcher
- Place of origin: Polish People's Republic

Service history
- In service: 1960–present
- Used by: See Operators
- Wars: Vietnam War; Communist insurgency in Thailand; 1982 Lebanon War; Lebanese Civil War; Rwandan Civil War

Production history
- Designed: 1960
- No. built: 5000+ kbkg wz. 1960 and 500 kbkg wz. 1960/72
- Variants: karabinek-granatnik wz.1960/72

Specifications
- Mass: 4.65 kg
- Length: 1075 mm
- Barrel length: 415 mm
- Cartridge: 7.62×39mm
- Caliber: 7.62mm
- Action: Gas-Operated, rotating bolt
- Rate of fire: 600 round/min (2 grenades/min)
- Muzzle velocity: 710 m/s
- Effective firing range: 300 m
- Feed system: 30-round detachable box magazine
- Sights: Adjustable iron sights, optional mount required for optical scope

The Karabinek-granatnik wzór 1960 (Polish for "Carbine-grenade launcher model 1960"), also designated PMK-DGN-60 or PMK-60, is a Polish-made version of the AK-47 assault rifle that can fire rifle grenades.

== Description ==
The LON-I grenade launcher is screwed onto the forward end of the rifle barrel and locked into place by means of a spring-loaded plunger mounted in the front sight base of a modified AK-47 rifle. The sight for the launcher is mounted on the rear sight base. A valve is fitted to the right side of the gas block, allowing the gas to be shut off (preventing it from leaving the barrel via the gas port) when the grenades are fired.

When using the rifle to launch grenades, a special rubber recoil pad is used and a special 10-round magazine is inserted. This magazine has a filler block that prevents it from being used with "normal" (i.e. bulleted) cartridges. There is also a regular version of this rifle as well that was not designed to shoot grenades.

== Operators ==
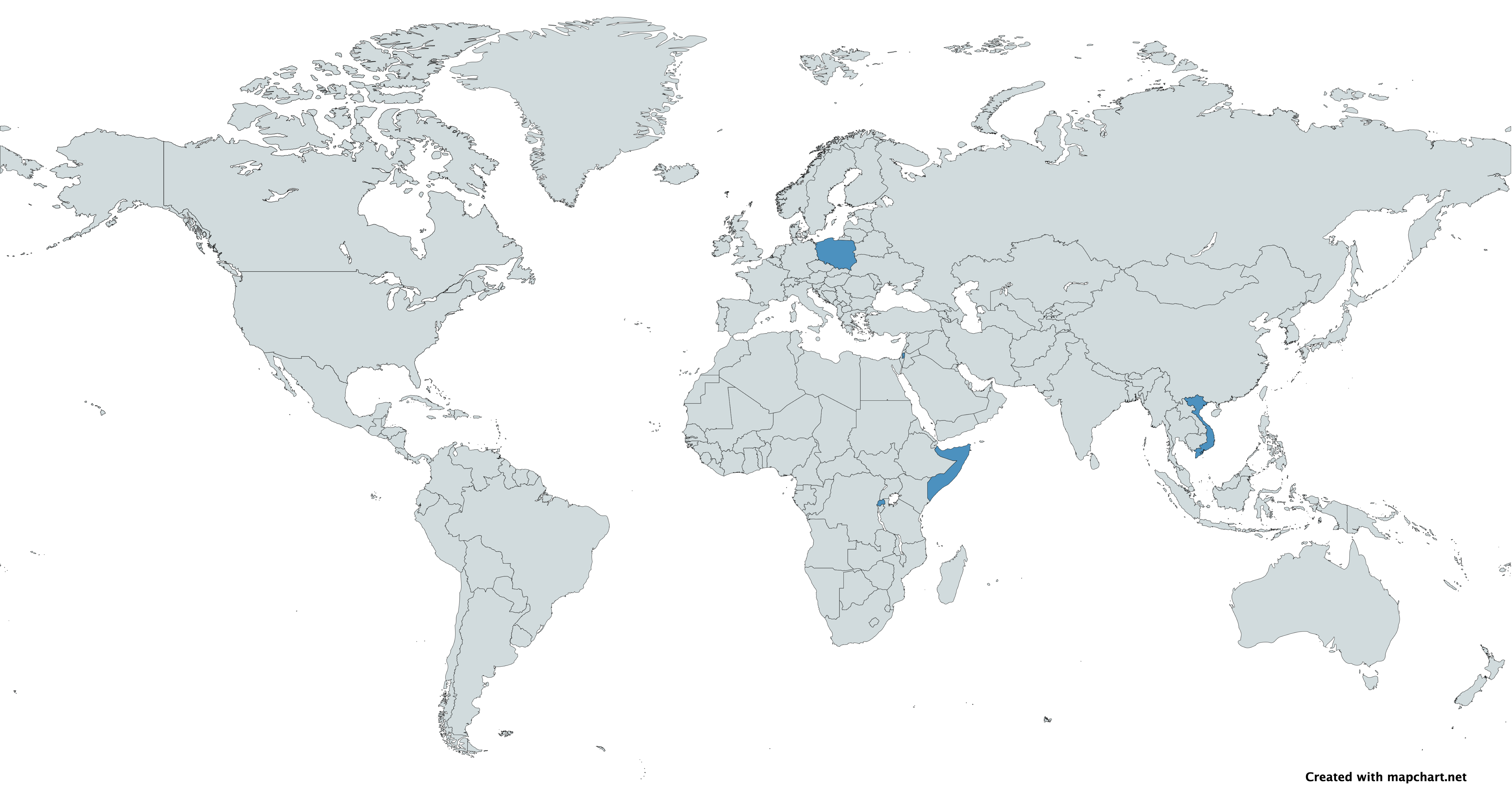
Map with Kbkg wz. 1960 users in blue

- Palestine: Limited use by Palestine Liberation Organization (PLO) guerrilla factions in Lebanon.
- Poland: Limited use now, mostly being replaced by the wz. 83 Pallad.
- Rwanda
- Somalia
- Vietnam: Used during the Vietnam War by the Vietcong and NVA.

== See also ==
- Kbk wz. 1988 Tantal
- Kbs wz. 1996 Beryl
