= FB Beryl =

Polish assault rifle

Beryl
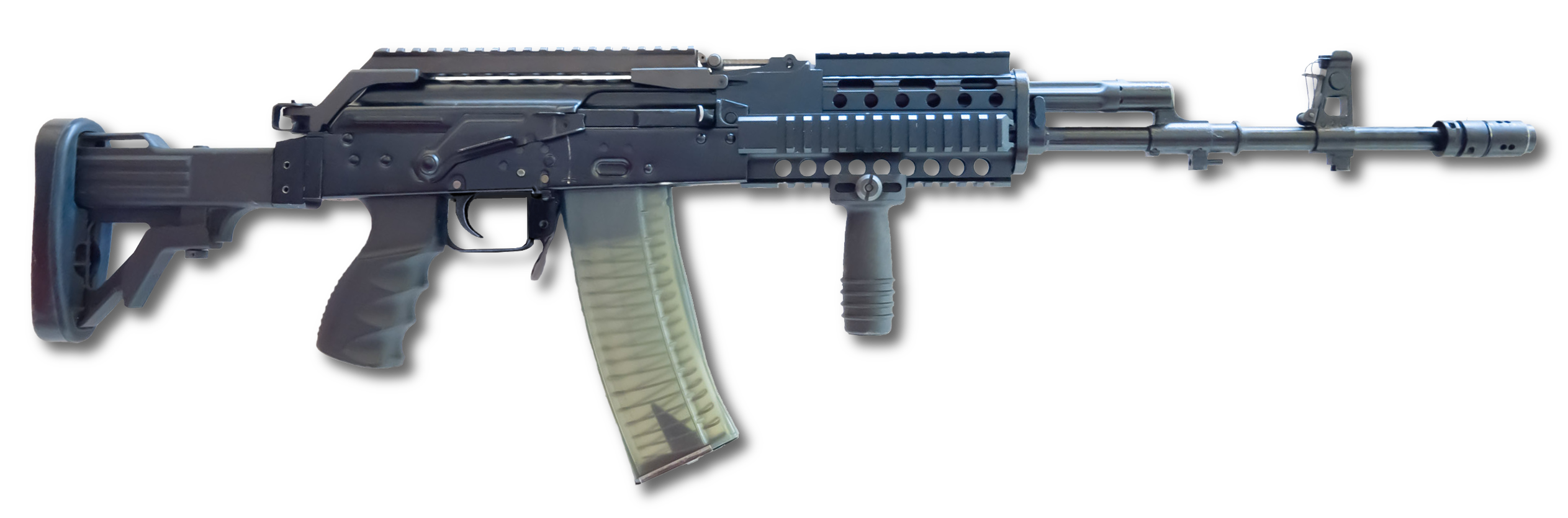
- The rifle cal. 5.56 wz. 96 Beryl.
- Type: Assault rifle
- Place of origin: Poland

Service history
- In service: 1997–present
- Used by: See Users
- Wars: War in Afghanistan; Kosovo Conflict; Iraq War; EUFOR Tchad/RCA; Boko Haram insurgency

Production history
- Designed: 1995–1996
- Manufacturer: FB Radom; Defence Industries Corporation of Nigeria
- Unit cost: $1,570
- Produced: 1999–present
- Variants: wz. 96 Beryl; wz. 96 Mini-Beryl; Beryl M762; Beryl M545; Beryl-Commando; "sport variants" (multiple models)

Specifications
- Mass: 3.35 kg (7.39 lb) (without magazine)
- Length: 943 mm (37.1 in) (stock extended); 742 mm (29.2 in) (stock folded)
- Barrel length: 457 mm (18.0 in)
- Cartridge: 5.56×45mm NATO; 7.62×39mm (Beryl M762); 5.45×39mm (Beryl M545)
- Action: Gas-operated, rotating bolt
- Rate of fire: 700 rounds/min
- Muzzle velocity: 920 m/s (3,018 ft/s)
- Maximum firing range: 600 m
- Feed system: 20-, or 30-round detachable box magazine; AK-47 magazines (Beryl M762); AK-74 magazines (Beryl M545)
- Sights: Rear sight notch on a sliding tangent, front post

The karabinek szturmowy wzór 96 "Beryl" (English: assault rifle pattern 1996 "Beryllium", abbreviated kbs wz. 96) is a Polish 5.56mm assault rifle, designed and produced by the Fabryka Broni Radom. The rifle replaced the 5.45×39mm FB Tantal and 7.62×39mm AKM rifles as the standard-issue service rifle of the Polish Armed Forces.

== Development ==
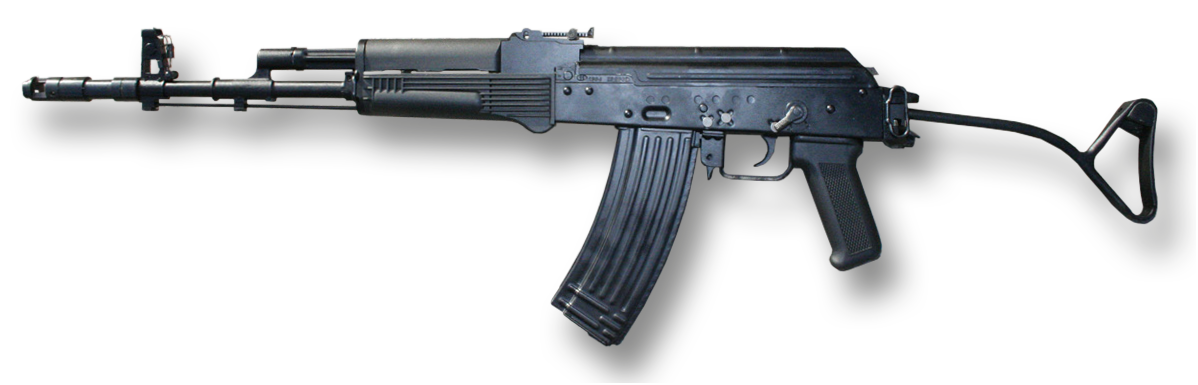
wz. 88 Tantal - progenitor of wz. 96 Beryl

Development work on a new service rifle (both a standard and carbine variant) adapted to use the intermediate 5.56×45mm NATO cartridge had been undertaken in 1995, however a functioning 5.56 mm rifle and carbine variant had already been available in Radom since 1991, known as the wz. 1991 (a rechambered wz. 88 Tantal rifle). The new weapon's specifications were approved in February 1995 and in December the same year, a prototype production batch consisting of 11 Beryl rifles was produced. In 1997 the weapon had been successfully evaluated and adopted into service as the 5,56 mm karabinek szturmowy wz. 1996 ("assault carbine pattern 1996"), but serial production started in 1999.

The Beryl subsequently became the standard Polish rifle. In 2011, there were more than 45,000 in the inventory, accounting for about half of the assault rifles in the Polish Army. On May 25, 2016, FB "Łucznik" Radom announced an order from the Polish Army for 26,000 Beryls and Mini-Beryls, though did not break it down by system.

Apart from Poland, 80 wz. 96A Beryls and 10 wz. 96A Mini Beryls are used by Lithuania (donated in May 2000 by Poland, including 10 rifles with Pallad grenade launcher and 10 rifles with CWL-1 scope with integrated laser rangefinder). Until 2002/2003 they were equipment of a special forces unit SOJ Aitvaras, operating in Afghanistan.

== Design ==
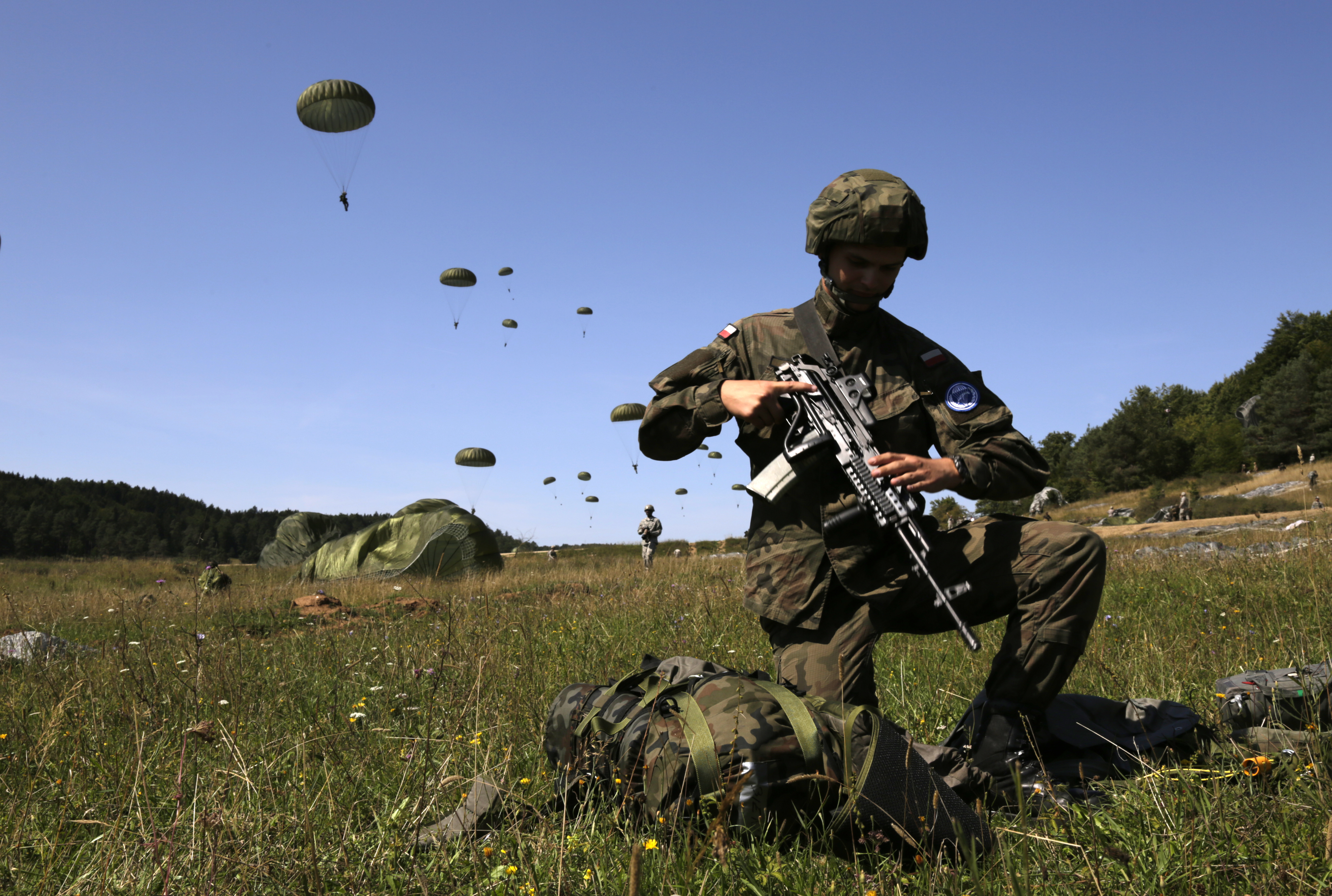
6th Airborne Brigade paratrooper equipped with the Beryl rifle, NATO exercise Swift Response, 26 Aug 2015

The Beryl's design layout and system of operation are similar to those of the Tantal rifle, and the principal differences, resulting primarily from using a different cartridge, include the following components: the barrel, receiver housing, buttstock, foregrip, muzzle device, sight system and magazine. With an adapter, it can use the M-16 NATO standard magazine.

The 457 mm-long barrel, has six right-hand grooves and a 228 mm (1:9 in) twist rate. The barrel's external profile (from the breech to the front sight base) is identical to the Tantal's barrel, but the length from the foresight base has a visible tapered contour with a decreasing diameter towards the muzzle end, used to mount a flash suppressor.

The flash hider can be used to mount and launch rifle grenades. The flash hider has a slight taper at the front that supports a bayonet and a little further to the rear – six side ports arranged in pairs. These ports are placed asymmetrically around the circumference of the flash hider and stabilize the weapon during continuous fire. Internally the flash suppressor features threading at the muzzle used to screw-in a blank firing attachment. Located mid-length on the flash hider is a cut-out with a ring retainer spring that secures a rifle grenade to the barrel.

The receiver housing contains several modifications over the receiver of the wz. 1988 rifle. It uses a reinforced rear stock trunnion, adapted for the new shoulder stock and a top-mounted Picatinny rail for mounting optical sights.

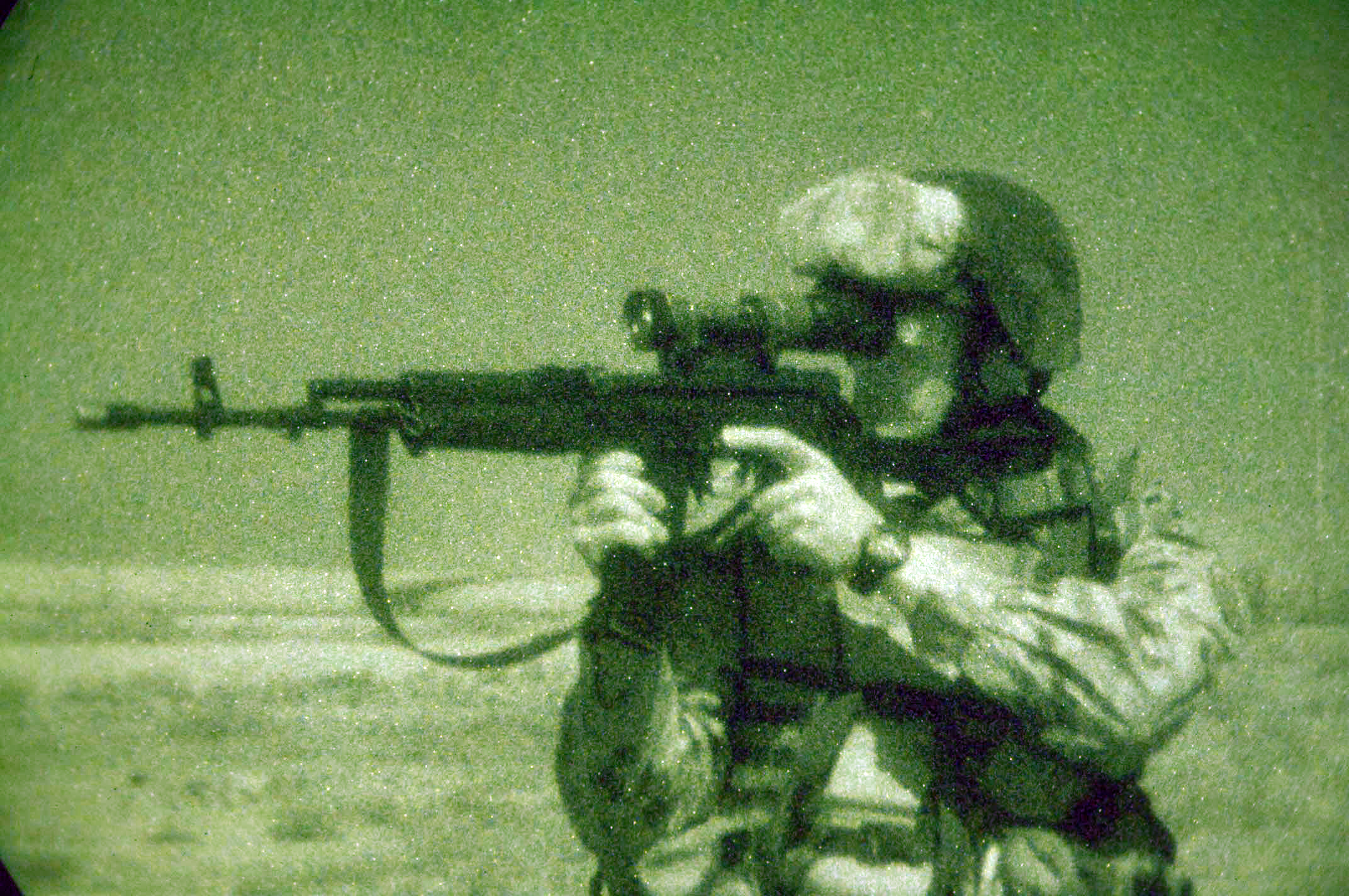
Polish Special Forces soldier holding a Beryl rifle at the high ready position, Operation Night Wolf, Ad Diwaniyah, Iraq, 11 Nov 2005

The side-folding tubular metal stock is coated with a thermal polymer shrink film. It has a metal shoulder stop covered with a rubber recoil pad. More recent models come with a collapsible stock (see picture of wz. 2004 model on right side of page).

The standard lower handguard features an angled rib pattern designed to enhance gripping by the support hand. The rear of the handguard features two molded notches that enable the 40 mm wz. 1974 grenade launcher to be mounted under the barrel (early versions of the wz. 1996 lacked these notches, fitted instead with handguards with lateral grooves). Some Beryl handguards are equipped with short Picatinny rails and an integral vertical foregrip.

The Beryl's sighting system is very similar to the setup used on the Tantal, it does however differ with the addition of twin cuts made into the sides of rear sight base that are used to fasten a bracket for mounting the following optical sights: the passive PCS-6 night sight, a CK-3 reflex optical collimator (red dot sight), LKA-4 telescopic sight and CWL-1 scope with integrated laser rangefinder. However, the most used additional sight for Beryl is EOTech 552 holographic weapon sight and PCS-5M passive night sight. PCS-6 and CWL-1 are introduced in small number.

The weapon's unique magazine is molded from plastic and is not interchangeable with magazines from the kbk wz. 1988 Tantal.

The Beryl has a long, trapezoid-shaped safety switch, similar to those found on the AK-47 or almost all of the AK series, but unlike the archetype, it does not act as a fire selector (its function is performed by a separate switch on the other side of the receiver).

The Beryl fires 5.56×45mm ammunition with a steel-core standard round, a tracer cartridge and a training slug, which are produced by Zakłady Metalowe Mesko in the town of Skarżysko-Kamienna.

Standard equipment shipped with the rifle includes: three spare magazines, four 15-round stripper clips, a stripper clip guide, bayonet, cleaning kit, lubricant bottle, cleaning rod (two-piece, stored in the cleaning kit pouch), sling, a magazine pouch and bipod. The rifle can also be fitted with a mounting system for optical sights and a blank-firing adaptor.

The Beryl was used to create a carbine variant known as the Mini-Beryl.

== Variants ==
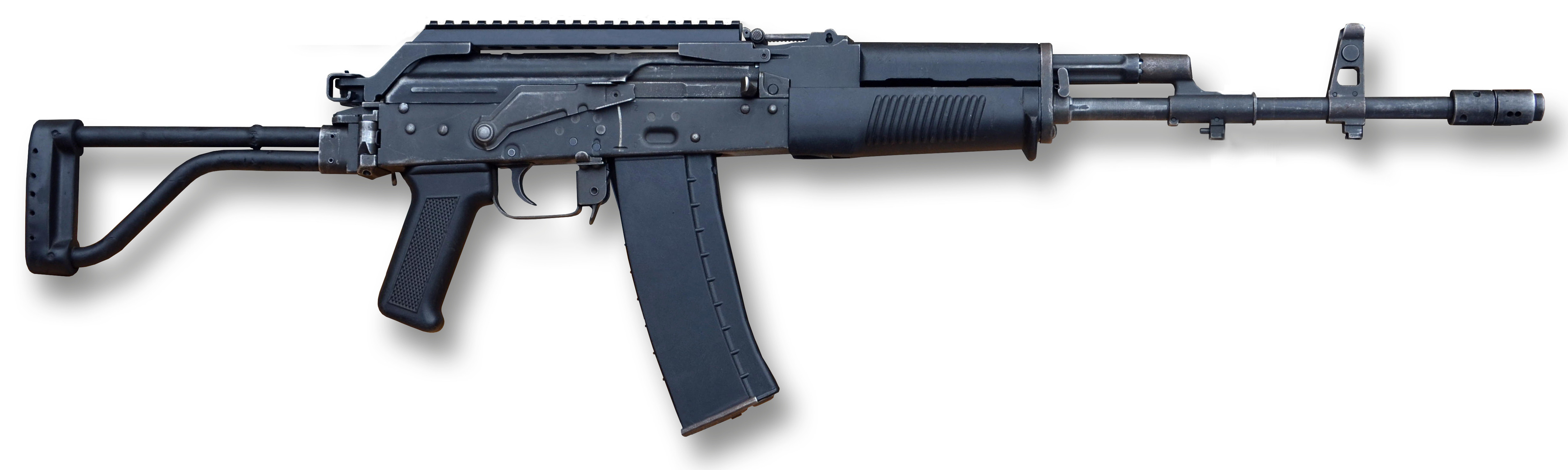
kbs wz. 96A Beryl

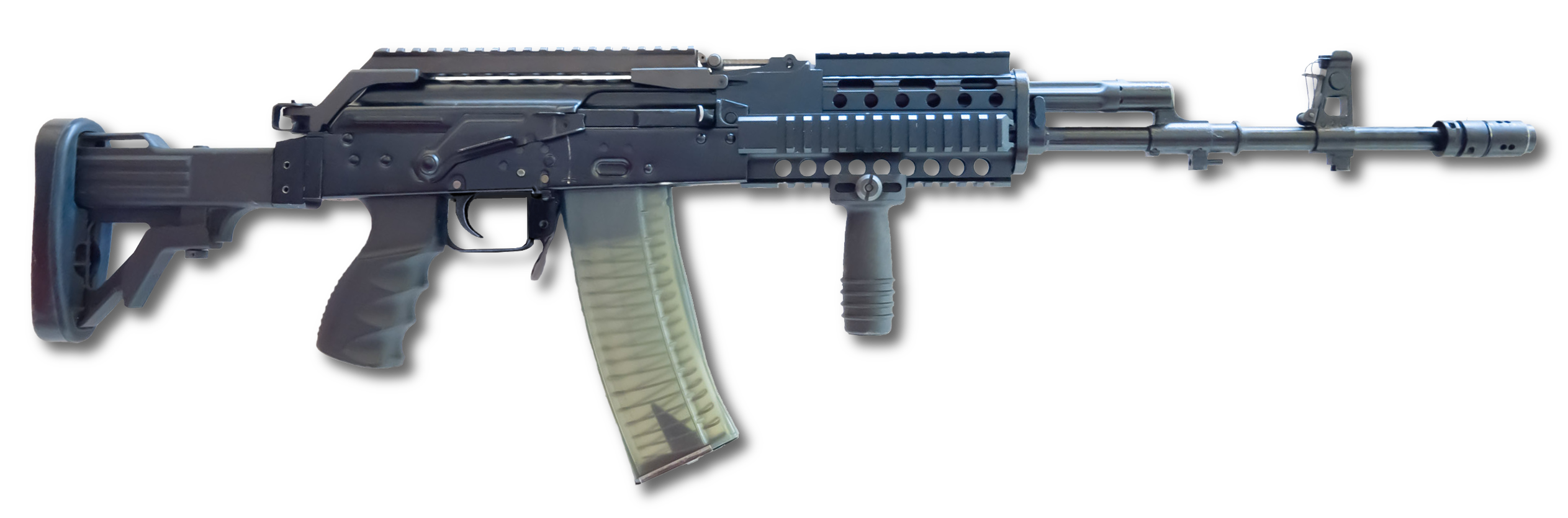
kbs wz. 96C Beryl

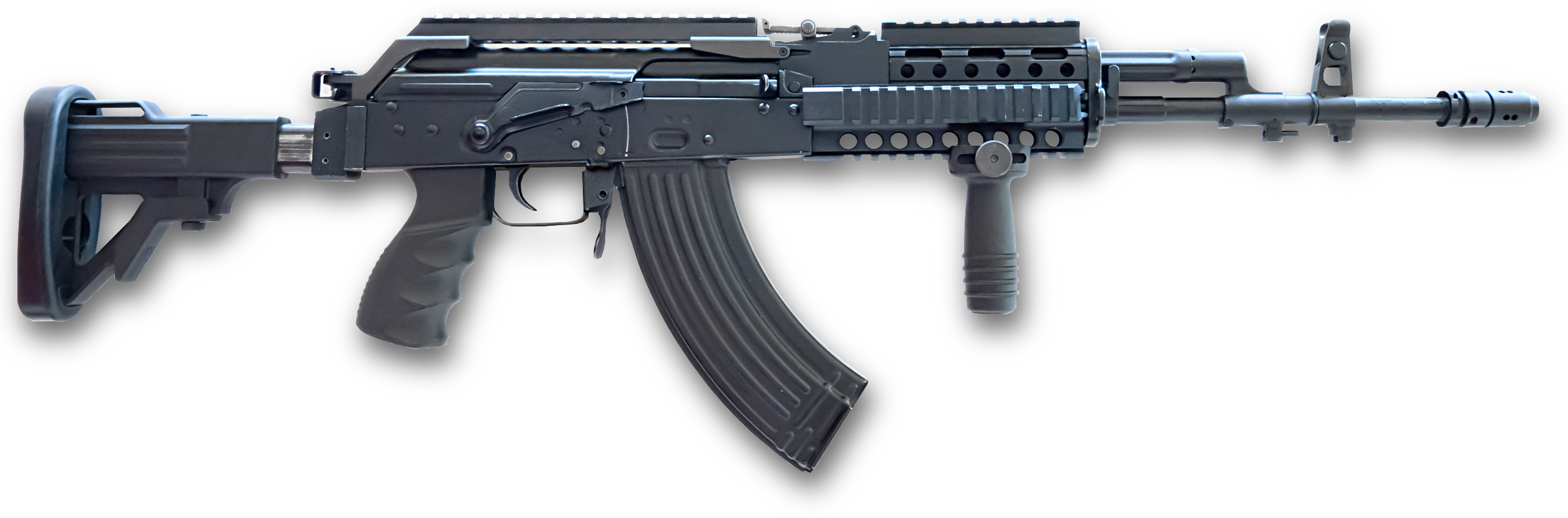
Beryl M762 variant chambered in 7.62×39mm ammunition

- kbs wz. 96A Beryl (1996): standard version of Beryl, the most produced version for Polish Forces, some examples were equipped with POPC I rail, where Polish sights (CWL-1, CK-3, LKA-4, PCS-6) could be mounted, but most mounted rail is POPC III. In Iraq, some Beryls were modified in the field and received wooden foregrip from PM md. 63
- kbs wz. 96B Beryl (2004): same as standard version, but with fixed foregrip and rails on it. Also, "B" version gets new rail, POPC II (short) and POPC III (long) which subtended the Picatinny standard (however, some "B" Beryls get POPC I rail).
- kbs wz. 96C Beryl (2009): version with new buttstock (which is fixed and telescopic), new rails (POPC IV), new handguard, magazines and new foregrip.
- kbs wz. 96D Beryl: an option available by the manufacturer, which allows to freely complete the rifle from elements of versions A, B and C
- Beryl M545 (2011): proposed 5.45×39mm export variant
- Beryl M762 (2013): "C" export variant chambered to fire 7.62×39mm ammunition. Bought by Nigeria.

== Users ==
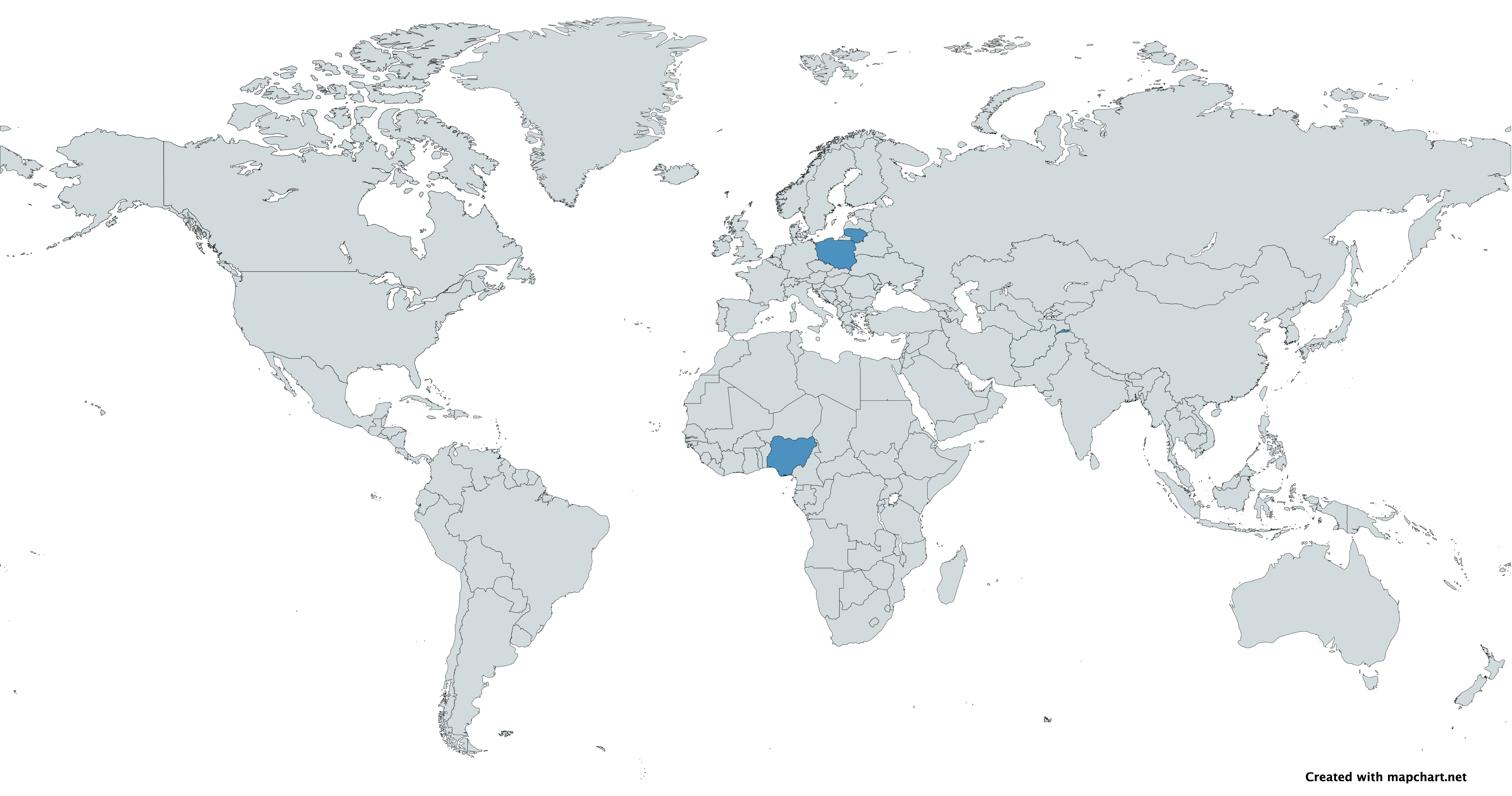
Map with FB Beryl users in blue

- Lithuania: 90 units of which 80 are wz. 96A in use by special forces and recon units (10 with wz. 74 Pallad grenade launcher and 10 with CWL-1 telescopic sight with laser pointer) and 10 are wz. 96 Mini-Beryl variant. Until 2003 used by SOJ Aitvaras elite special forces unit in Afghanistan.
- Nigeria: 3,200 M762 rifles (in March 2018, the Defence Industries Corporation of Nigeria signed a letter of intent to manufacture the rifles in Nigeria)
- Poland: Current standard-issue rifle of the Polish Land Forces, with around 86,000 units in service.

== Non-state users ==
- Islamic State – West Africa Province (ISWAP): captured from Nigerian Army.

== See also ==
- FB Mini-Beryl
- FB MSBS
- FB Tantal
- Kbkg wz. 1960
