= Pallad grenade launcher =

Wz. 1974 Pallad
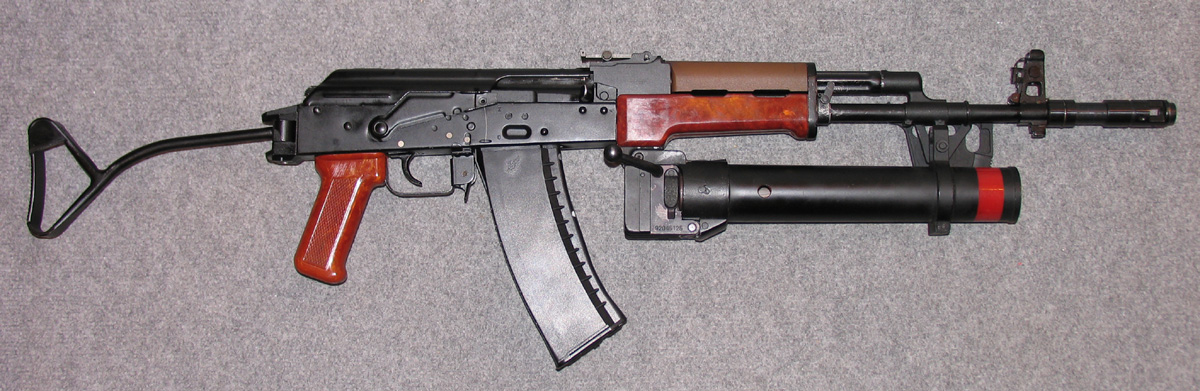
- The wz. 74 grenade launcher mounted on a wz. 88 Tantal rifle
- Type: Grenade launcher
- Place of origin: Polish People's Republic

Service history
- In service: 1974 - Present
- Used by: Poland; Lithuania

Production history
- Designed: 1968-1970
- Manufacturer: Zakłady Mechaniczne Tarnów
- Produced: 1970 - ???
- Variants: wz. 1983 Pallad-D

Specifications
- Mass: 1.25 kg with mount (wz. 74); 2.3 kg (wz. 83)
- Length: 324 mm (wz. 74); 670 mm with stock extended / 395 mm with stock collapsed (wz. 83)
- Barrel length: 267 mm
- Cartridge: 40x47mm
- Action: Break action
- Muzzle velocity: 78 m/s
- Effective firing range: Sights adjustable up to 430 m
- Feed system: Breech-loaded, single-shot
- Sights: Notched short range quadrant sight (0 to 400 m), folding leaf sight graduated from 170 to 430 m

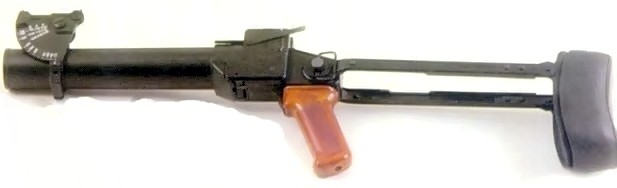
wz. 83 Pallad-D

The Pallad (also known as the wz. 1974) is a 40 mm Polish underslung grenade launcher, developed for use with the AKM assault-rifle and intended to replace the kbkg wz. 1960 grenade-launcher rifle. The name of the weapon reflects the Polish-language word for palladium.

The development of the weapon drew on concepts provided by Józef Brodacki.

The wz. 1983 Pallad D, the stand-alone version of the wz. 74, features a stock and AK-type pistol grip.

There are also variants compatible with 40x46mm NATO named GP-40 (40x46mm version of wz. 74 Pallad) and GS-40 (40x46mm version of wz. 83 Pallad-D).

== Design ==
The Pallad grenade launcher is a single-shot weapon adapted for mounting under the barrel of a rifle (wz. 1974) or as a stand-alone weapon (wz. 1983). The wz. 1974 grenade launcher is suspended from the rifle at two points: at the front using the barrel clamp of the grenade launcher and at the rear using a bracket that connects the grenade launcher to a special rifle bed.

The basic elements of the weapon are:

- A grooved barrel made of hardened aluminum alloy and permanently screwed into the receiver
- The lock - tilted, rotated on a pin and locked in the closed position with a bolt placed in the receiver.

A two-chamber propellant system is used to drive the grenades. The grenade launcher is equipped with a mechanism to prevent accidental firing.

The sight is mounted on the barrel clamp, and its main element is the setting dial, in which the front sight and rear sight are mounted. There are two setting scales marked on the dial: one for the group of flat tracks (exposed targets), the other for steep tracks (hidden targets).

== Variants ==
- 7,62 mm karabinek-granatnik wzór 1974 – a set consisting of a Pallad grenade launcher and an AKM rifle
- 5,45 mm karabinek-granatnik wzór 1974 – a set consisting of a Pallad grenade launcher and an wz. 88 Tantal rifle
- 5,56 mm karabinek-granatnik wzór 1974 – a set consisting of a Pallad grenade launcher and an wz. 96 Beryl rifle
- granatnik wzór 1983 – stand-alone grenade launcher with folding stock (other designation is Pallad-D)

== Users ==
- Lithuania – 10 (5,56mm karabinek-granatnik wz. 1974) were given from Poland and in use by Lithuania before 2003
- Poland – 7,62mm karabinek-granatnik wz. 1974 (limited use), 5,45mm karabinek-granatnik wz. 1974 (phased out), 5,56mm karabinek-granatnik wz.1974 and wz. 83 Pallad-D are in use by Polish Land Forces
