= FB Tantal =

Polish assault rifle

Tantal
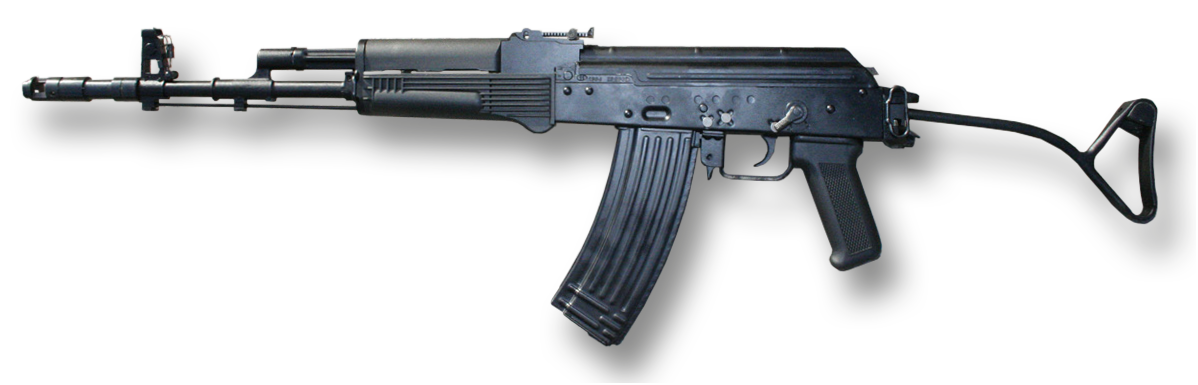
- The Kbk wz. 88 Tantal
- Type: Assault rifle
- Place of origin: Poland

Service history
- In service: 1991–present (Middle East)
- Used by: See Users
- Wars: Kurdish–Turkish conflict Kosovo War; UNDOF; Iraqi insurgency Russo-Ukrainian War

Production history
- Designer: OBR Radom
- Designed: 1981–1988
- Manufacturer: FB Radom
- Produced: 1989–1994
- No. built: ~25,000
- Variants: Kbkg wz. 1974, skbk wz. 1989 Onyks

Specifications
- Mass: 3.69 kg (8.14 lb)
- Length: 943 mm (37.1 in) stock extended / 748 mm (29.4 in) stock folded
- Barrel length: 432 mm (17.0 in)
- Cartridge: 5.45×39mm
- Action: Gas-actuated, rotating bolt
- Rate of fire: 700 rounds/min
- Muzzle velocity: 880 m/s (2,887 ft/s)
- Effective firing range: 500 m
- Maximum firing range: 100–1,000 m sight adjustments
- Feed system: 30-round detachable box magazine
- Sights: Rear sight notch sight on sliding scale, front post

The karabinek wzór 1988 (Carbine Model 1988) Tantal is a 5.45×39mm assault rifle designed and produced in Poland in the late 1980s.

== Development ==
Design work on the new rifle officially began in 1984 at the government-owned Ośrodek Badawczo-Rozwojowy (OBR) in the city of Radom at the request of the Polish Ministry of Defense (the OBR institute had already been studying a possible 5.45mm weapon since late 1980). In 1985, the weapon’s parameters were confirmed and factory tests were conducted by the end of that year. In 1986 the first batch of prototypes was fabricated for evaluation and qualification testing.

These early prototypes, initially designated wz. 1981, were modeled on the Soviet 7.62mm AKM assault rifle. As the weapon was intended to be able to launch rifle grenades, a newly designed, multi-functional muzzle device and a sturdier folding shoulder stock were used (the wire stock is a copy of the wire stock used on the East German MPi-KMS-72 rifle). Additionally, the wz. 81 was equipped with a mechanically limited burst fire mode, borrowed from the AKMS wz. 1980 prototype developed in the late 1970s by OBR.

By the end of 1987 the rifle was extensively overhauled and improved (among the changes made, a series of components were introduced that were meant to be interchangeable with the AK-74, including the bolt carrier, bolt, magazines and the burst fire mode was further refined). In January 1988, these product improved prototypes were again evaluated, and in 1989 the rifle was declared to have met its requirements, followed by an order for a pre-production batch, which was manufactured that same year. In 1990 the rifles were successfully evaluated and then transferred for final operational testing. In 1991 the rifle was introduced into service with the Polish Army as the 5,45 mm karabinek wz. 1988 (kbk wz. 88).

The weapon’s design was authored by the team of engineers at OBR in Radom, under the guidance of B. Szpaderski. The rifle was produced exclusively with a folding wire stock by the Łucznik Arms Factory in Radom.

== Design details ==
The Tantal is a selective fire, gas piston operated weapon that taps expanding exhaust gases off through a port in the barrel to a gas cylinder above the barrel. The barrel is locked against its longitudinal axis by a right rotating bolt. A spring extractor is contained inside the bolt head, and a fixed ejector—inside the receiver housing.

The fire control selector, with its lever located on the left side of the receiver wall, enables fully automatic fire (lever in the "C"-marked position), semi-automatic fire ("P") and three-round burst fire mode ("S"). The selector can be operated with the safety either engaged or disabled. The burst mode is achieved through a ratcheting device on the left side of the receiver that interacts with the trigger group on the trigger-disconnector and hammer pins. Its location eliminates the need for an anti-pin walkout device, such as a Shepard's Crook on semi-auto AKs and extended auto sear spring on full-autos. It also has an advantage to the M16A2/M16A4 (RO905)'s burst mode in that releasing the trigger in the middle of a burst (one-two shot fired instead of full three) causes the ratchet to reset making the next three-round burst a new, full one instead of a continuation of the previous. The PA md. 86 achieves burst fire in a very similar manner with ratcheting device on trigger-disconnector and hammer pins though simply has a standard AK selector switch with an additional notch for burst and still retains the Rate Reducer, which the Tantal lacks.

The weapon is secured against misfires through a manually operated safety (whose lever, as in the AKM is located on the right side of the receiver), that disables the trigger bar and limits the movement of the bolt carrier. Sliding the safety selector to the top position (marked with a "Z" symbol) secures the weapon, lowering the lever down ("O" setting) disables the safety. The Tantal feeds from a double-column curved box magazine, made from a synthetic bakelite material or stamped metal, with a 30-round cartridge capacity.

The cold hammer forged barrel has a chrome-plated bore with four right-hand grooves at a 200 mm twist rate. It is equipped with a multifunction muzzle brake that can be used to launch rifle grenades.

The Tantal features a metal wire side-folding stock (folds to the right side), ended with a profiled shoulder pad. The rifle can also use a fixed wooden or synthetic buttstock designed for AKM or AK-74 rifles. Both the upper and lower handguard and pistol grip are fabricated from bakelite, although a limited number of Tantal-specific black polymer handguards and pistol grips have also been produced. Most handguards designed for use with the wz. 1996 Beryl assault rifle may also be installed on the Tantal.

The rifle has mechanically adjustable iron sight that consists of a notch on a sliding tangent and forward post. The rear sight’s drop arm has a range scale engraved with settings from 1 to 10 (corresponding to firing ranges from 100 to 1,000 m, graduated every 100 m) and a fixed setting "S" that is the equivalent to the "4" setting on the range scale. Additionally, the sight assembly is fitted with a radium gas illuminated vial that enables use in low light and near dark conditions.

Equipment supplied with the Tantal includes: three spare magazines, a 6H4 type bayonet with scabbard, bipod, four 15-round stripper clips (they enable rapid magazine charging), a stripper clip guide, cleaning kit, sling, magazine pouch and a lubricant bottle. The weapon's muzzle brake can also be replaced with a blank firing adaptor for use with blanks during training exercises.

The wz. 88 rifle fires the intermediate 5.45×39mm round with either standard, tracer or training cartridges, all produced locally by Zakłady Metalowe "Mesko" in the town of Skarżysko-Kamienna.

== Variants ==
The Tantal was used to develop the Onyks carbine, the karabinek-granatnik wz. 1974 rifle/grenade launcher combination and a "night" variant of the wz. 1988, equipped with a receiver side-rail used to mount an NSP-3 night sight (or Polish PCS-5 night sight).

The prototype Kbk wz. 1990 was also created as a wz. 88 chambered in 5.56×45mm NATO instead, however this was rejected due to lack of interest from the Polish Army.

== Users ==
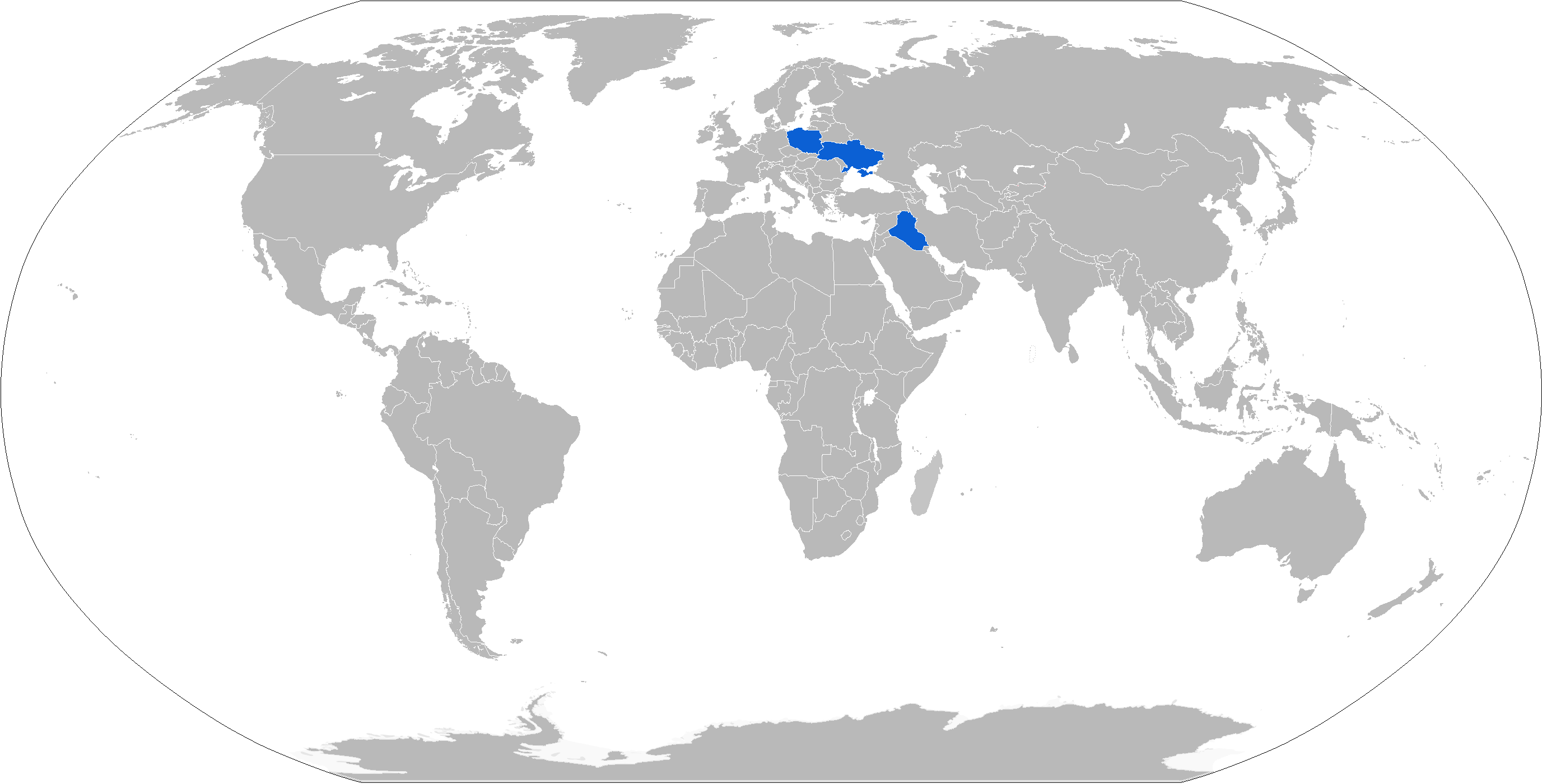
Map with wz. 88 Tantal operators in blue.

- Iraq: 10,000 units bought from Poland in 2005/2006.
- Kurdistan Workers' Party
- Poland: 25,000 units, partially withdrawn from service in 2005, some kept in storage.
- Syria
- Ukraine: Donated from Poland in 2022.

== See also ==
- Kbkg wz. 1960
- Kbs wz. 1996 Beryl
- Skbk wz. 1989 Onyks
- List of assault rifles
