= Samodzielny Pododdział Antyterrorystyczny Policji =

Poland police

Samodzielny Pododdział Antyterrorystyczny Policji (SPAP, lit. Independent Counter-terrorism Police Subdivision) are police tactical units of the Police of Poland operating under the supervision of the Chief Police Commander. The SPAP units operate under the voivodeship commands.

The comparable police unit on the national level is the BOA BOA KGP.

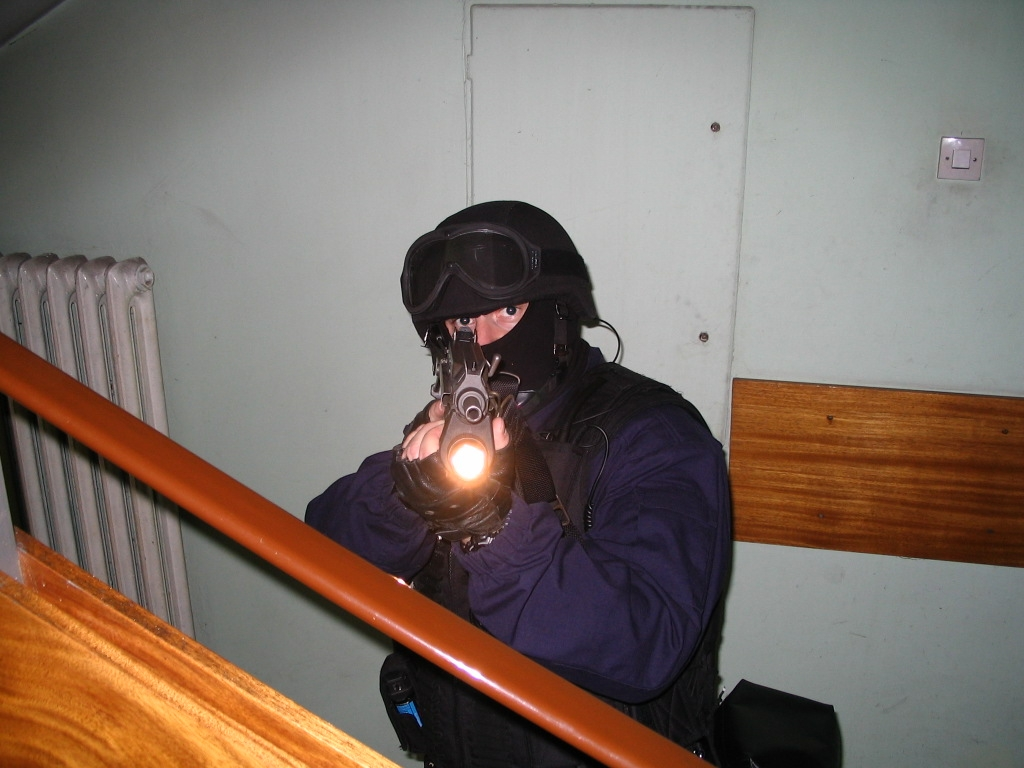
Police officer of Poznan Police Department SPAP unit during training 2006

== History ==
The first special police units within the police of Poland were formed on 1 March 1978 as part of the paramilitary Motorized Reserves of the Citizens' Militia. In 1988, these units were increased to the size of companies. After the disbanding of the Polish Citizens' Militia and the creation of the modern Police Service, the special police units were named counter-terror companies.

In 2000, the counter-terror companies were separated from the existing structures and became directly subordinate to the respective commander of the Voivodeships, along with the name change to the current system.

== Mission and Tasks ==
- High-risk arrests
- Counter-terrorism operations
- Assistance in police operations with divers
- Assistance in rescue operations
- Explosive Ordnance Disposal
- VIP protection
- Hostage rescue

== Training ==
Due to the hazardous nature of their work, SPAP officers undergo a rigorous selection and training process.

Their training includes tactical training, advanced marksmanship and Combatives. Upon completion of their training, further specialization in various fields such as parachuting, altitude rescue, VIP-protection or IED-disposal is possible.

During their creation, their training was heavily influenced by American, English, French and Israeli police tactical units.

SPAP uniform badge

== Organisation ==
SPAP units operate in each police voivodeship commands. They are located in Warsaw, Szczecin, Gdańsk, Białystok, Łódź, Poznań, Wrocław, Katowice, Kraków, and Rzeszów. In larger cities, SPKP units may consist of up to 55 officers each. In smaller voivodship cities, SPAP units consist of approximately 20 policemen. These are located in: Kielce, Radom, Lublin, Gorzów Wielkopolski, Olsztyn, and Bydgoszcz.

Depending on the size of the local police units, the SPAP officers operate in their respective units as part-time officers and are only called into their units when needed.

In 2017, the police of Poland underwent a process of reorganisation. The existence of BOA KGP as the national unit was maintained. However, the SPAPs units were reorganised and their structure, equipment and logistics were harmonised. The tasks of SPAPs were also specified in detail, adapting the order of the Chief Police Commander to the requirements of the Act on anti-terrorist activities.

SPAP has its own bomb-disposal section, in addition one of the sub-units is constantly on duty at the unit in case of operations.
