= KWM-02 =

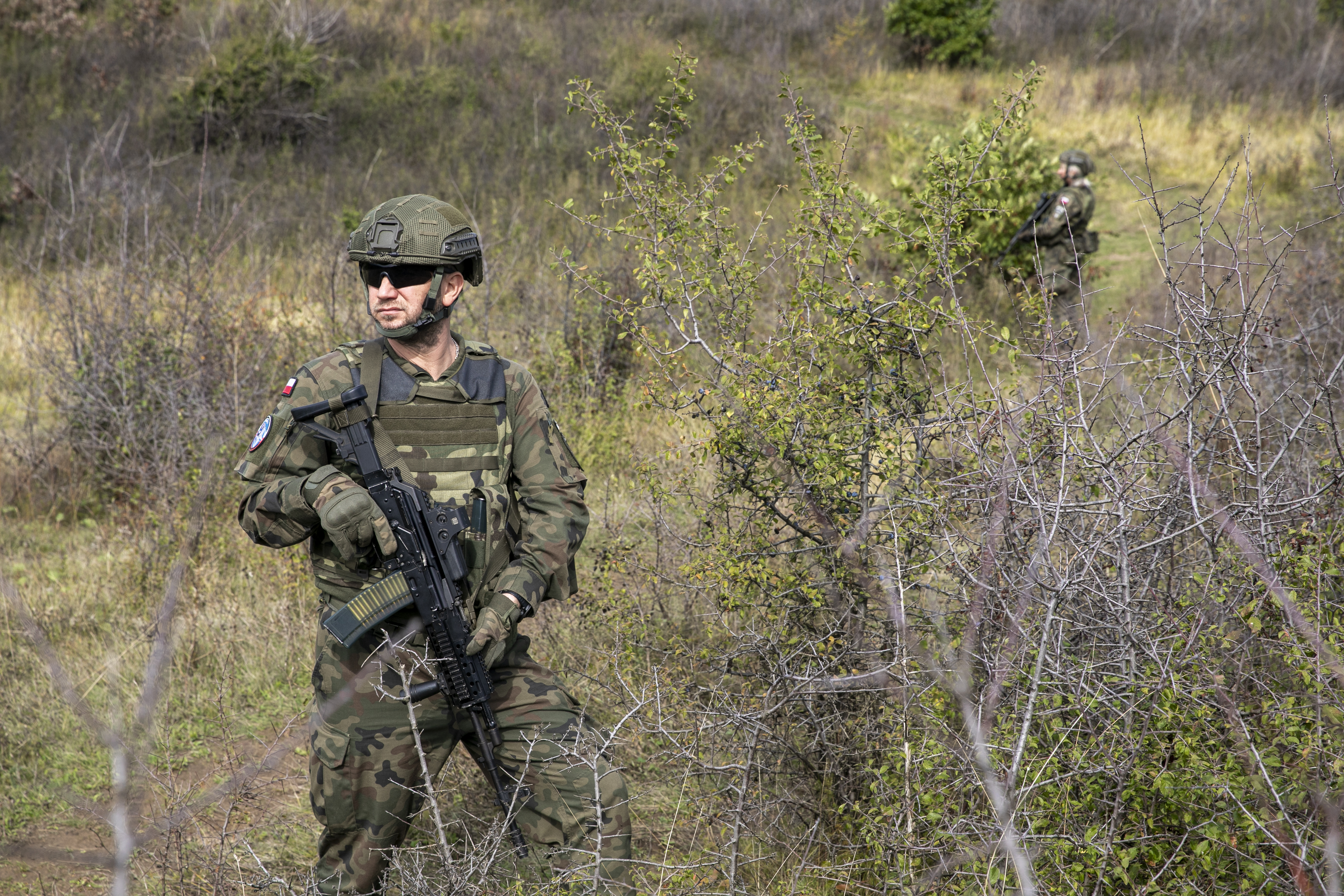
- Polish soldier wearing KWM-02 during Regional Command East of the NATO-led KFOR mission.
- Type: Bulletproof vest
- Place of origin: Poland

Service history
- In service: 2009–present
- Used by: Polish Land Forces; Ukrainian Ground Forces

Production history
- Manufacturer: Maskpol
- No. built: ~39,700
- Variants: KWM-02, KWM-02M/UKO, KWM-02/2020

Specifications
- Mass: 4 to 13 kg

The KWM-02 is Polish modular bulletproof vest developed by Maskpol for Polish Armed Forces.

== Purpose ==
KWM-02 is standard bulletproof vest along with KWM-01 that are in use by Polish Armed Forces. Its purpose is to meet modern combat requirements. Its adaptability allows for various configurations to suit different operational needs.

== History ==
In 2009, KWM-01 was delivered to soldiers of the Polish Military Contingent in Afghanistan and the Polish Military Contingent in Iraq. However, it turned out that the vest had major drawbacks. Therefore Maskpol carried out modification processes to upgrade the vest, and the result was a new version of KWM-02 codename "KANDAHAR". The vest was delivered that same year to the Polish army as well as to the Polish Military Contingent in Afghanistan.

=== Orders ===
On December 23, 2016, two executive agreements were signed for the delivery of helmets and vests. These are 60.4 thousand Hełm wz.2005B helmets for PLN 54.2 million with delivery in 2016-2019 and 19.7 thousand KWM-02 vests for PLN 194 million with delivery in the same period. On May 29, 2019, an additional 2 thousand KWM-02 vests were ordered for PLN 20 million gross with delivery in 2019–2020.

An additional order for over 2,000 KWM-02 vests, totaling PLN 20 million gross, was placed on May 29, 2019, with delivery scheduled for 2019–2020.

A further contract worth PLN 20 million was signed on October 20, 2021, for roughly 2,000 KWM-02 vests. A year later, the October 20 contract was changed, adding PLN 25 million to the order amount.

2023: An agreement was signed to deliver 13.5 thousand pieces of KWM-02 protective vests. Their purchase will cost the state treasury PLN 160 million gross.

== Specifications ==
- Fully compatible with standard MOLLE/PALS webbing:
- Quick-release (QR) mechanism for rapid removal in emergencies and includes a reinforced drag handle for safe extraction
- Ballistic resistance according to PN-V-87000:2011.
- Soft insert – Bullet resistance: K1A.
- Fragment resistance: O2.
- Additional insert (hard ballistic plates):
- Bullet resistance:
- Front ballistic insert: K4
- Back ballistic insert: K4
- 4 to 13 kg

== Users ==
Poland
Ukraine

== See also ==
- KWM-01
- Plate Carrier Gryf
- OLV (anti-fragmentation vest)
- Improved Outer Tactical Vest

== Bibliography ==
- "MULTI-THREAT BODY ARMOUR SYSTEM KWM-02". www.maskpol.com.pl.
