= KWM-01 =

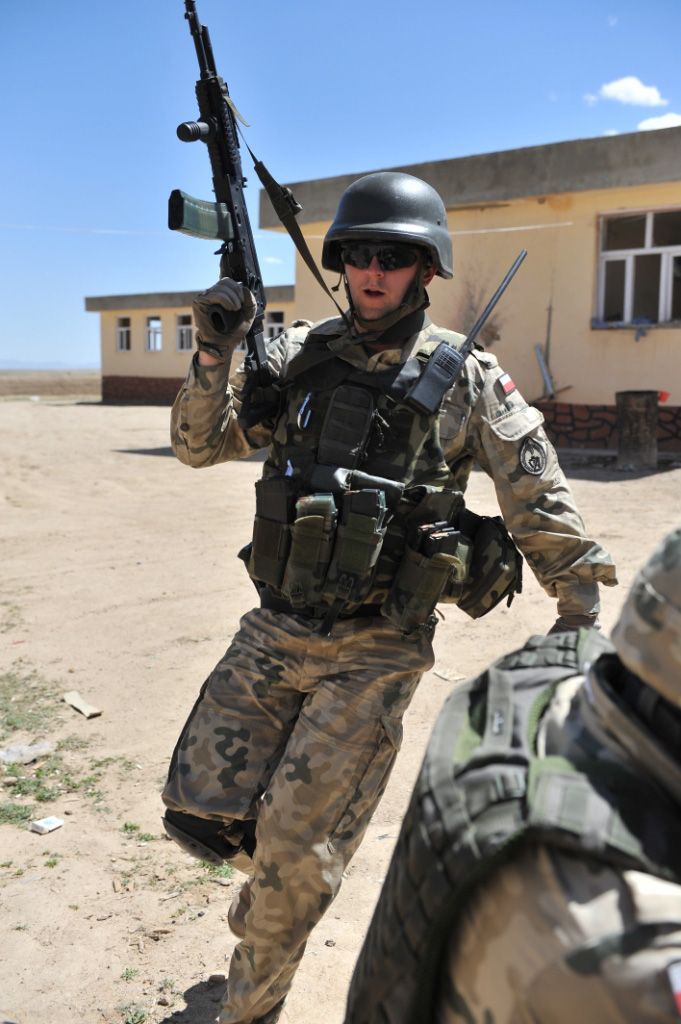
- Polish soldier wearing KWM-01 during mission in Afganistan.
- Type: Bulletproof vest
- Place of origin: Poland

Service history
- In service: 2009–present
- Used by: Polish Land Forces

Production history
- Manufacturer: Maskpol
- No. built: Unknown

The KWM-01 is Polish modular bulletproof vest developed by Maskpol for Polish Armed Forces.

== Development ==
Designed in the mid-2000s by Maskpol to meet the Polish Armed Forces' requirements for modular battlefield protection.

== Transition to KWM-02 ==
In 2009, recognising the need for improved protection, Maskpol upgraded the design into the KWM‑02 "Kandahar", introducing hard ballistic plates, quick-release systems, and better sizing.

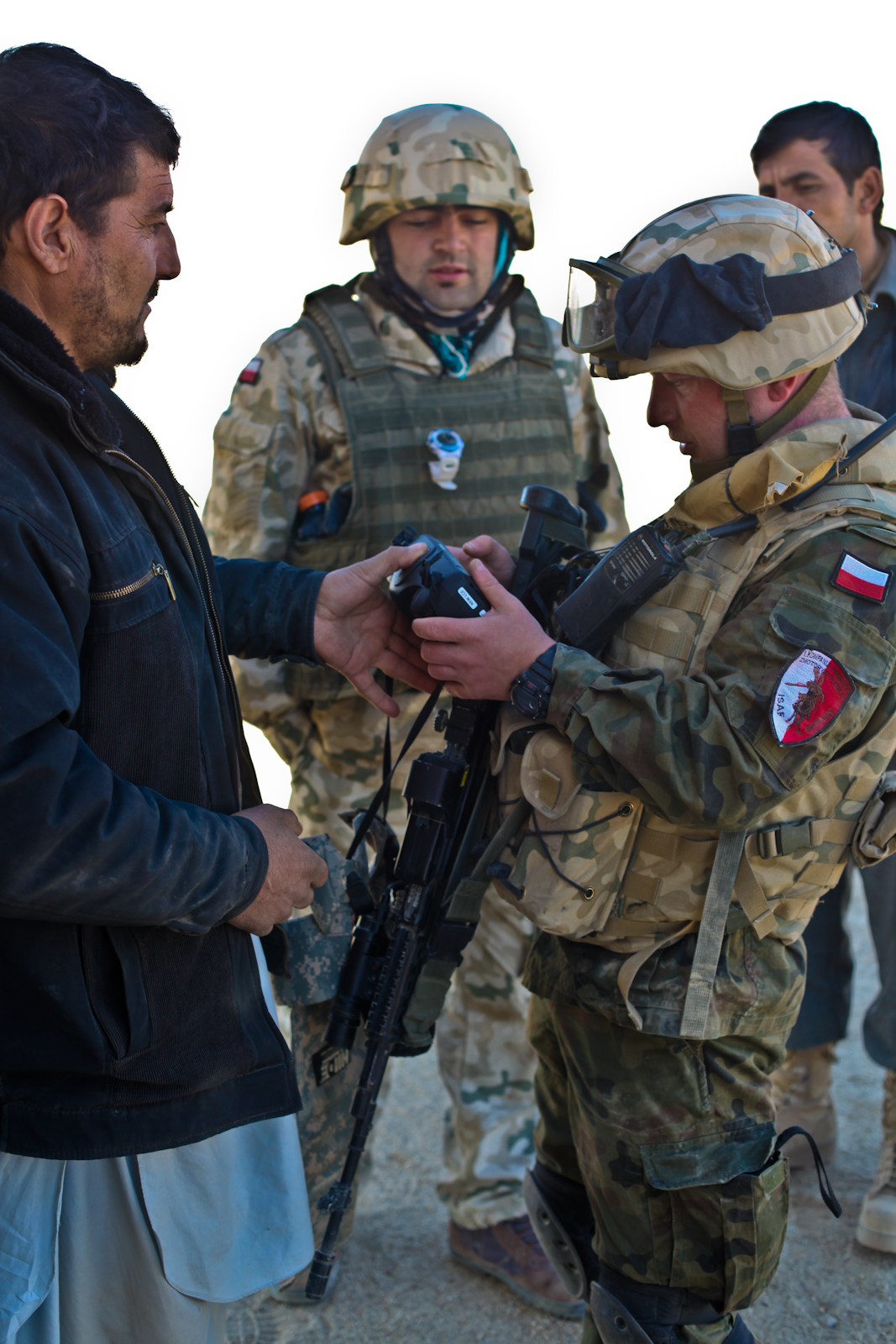
Operation Enduring Freedom DVIDS358247

== Specifications ==
- Featured compatibility with MOLLE/PALS webbing
- PN‑V‑87000 standard, offering
- K1A-level soft-ballistic
- 2-level fragment protection)
- Cordura® durable
- Fabric, internal mesh

== Users ==
Poland

== See also ==
- KWM-02
- OLV (anti-fragmentation vest)
- Improved Outer Tactical Vest
- Plate Carrier Gryf
- KKP‑01
- KPC-02
- KKZ‑01

== Bibliography ==
- "MULTI-THREAT BODY ARMOUR SYSTEM KWM-02". www.maskpol.com.pl.
