= Hełm HB-04 =

Polish combat helmet

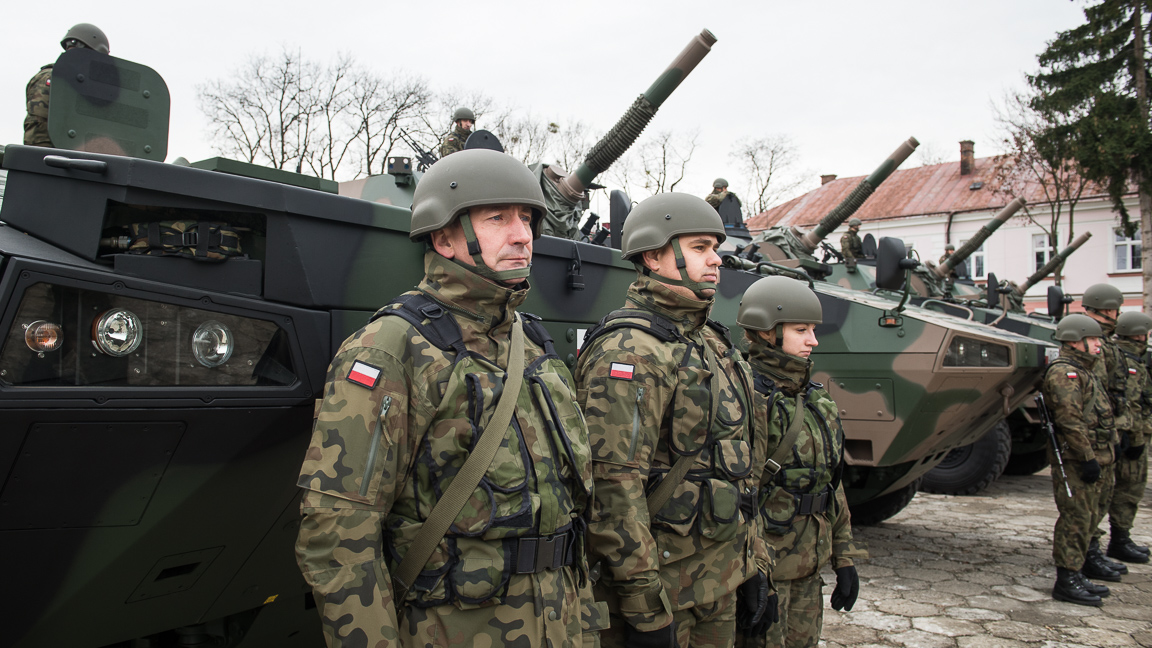
- Type: Combat helmet
- Place of origin: Poland

Service history
- In service: ? - Present
- Used by: Poland

Production history
- Designer: Maskpol
- Designed: ?
- Manufacturer: Maskpol
- Produced: ? - Present
- Variants: Hełm HB-04; HP-04; HP-04 SG

Specifications
- Weight: 1,3kg - 1,5 kg

The Hełm HB-04 is a ballistic helmet developed by Maskpol.

== History ==
The HB-04 was publicly shown at the Indo Defence arms exhibition in 2022.

== Development ==
The helmet, previously designated as HP-04 (police helmet-04), was named as the HB-04. The name change is purely cosmetic, but it is more orderly and corresponds to the actual state of affairs because the helmet has changed from a police helmet to a "universal" helmet. The helmet is used in police under the original name HP-04, in the Border Guard it is called HP-04 SG and in the Polish Army it is used by the crews of Polish 155 mm self-propelled howitzers AHS Krab.

A distinctive feature of the Krab artillery helmets is large Velcro patches glued to the surface of the shells to make it difficult for the hearing protector headband to slide over the shell.

The method of mounting the headband on the outside of the CG634 helmet. A similar method of placing Velcro on the surface of the skull is used by the Croatian army.

== Operators ==
- Poland:
  - Used by the police under the original name HP-04.
  - Used by Border Guard in HP-04 SG variant.
  - Used by the Polish Army for the usage of 155 mm self-propelled howitzers AHS Krab. Additional 84,000 HB-04s ordered from 2023 to 2024 for a total of PLN 134.4 million, which would replace the Hełm wz. 2005.

== Bibliography ==
- "HB-04 BALLISTIC HELMET". www.maskpol.com.pl/en/.
