= Hełm wz. 2005 =

Polish combat helmet

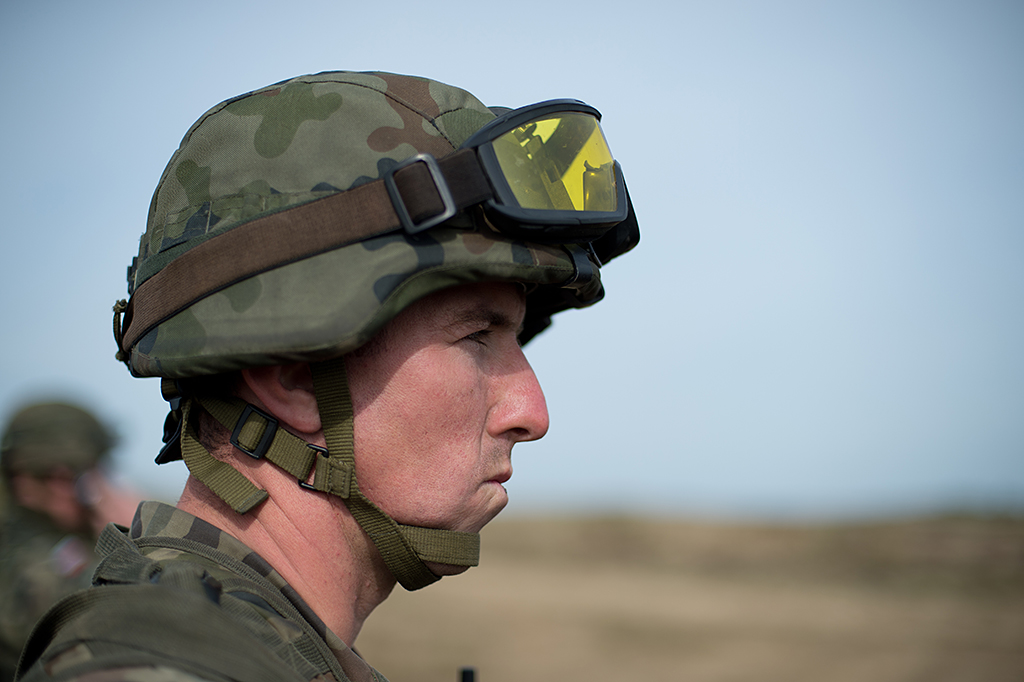
- A Polish soldier with a wz. 2005 helmet
- Type: Combat helmet
- Place of origin: Poland

Service history
- In service: 2006-present
- Used by: See Users for details
- Wars: Iraq War; War in Afghanistan; European Union Military Operation in Chad and the Central African Republic; Russo-Ukrainian War

Production history
- Designed: 2005
- Manufacturer: Maskpol
- Produced: 2006-present

Specifications
- Weight: 1,4-1,6 kg

The hełm wz. 2005 is a combat helmet of the Polish Armed Forces used since 2006.

== History ==
Work on a new helmet to replace the previous model wz. 2000 for the Polish army was undertaken at the Military Institute of Armament Technology and at the Maskpol SA company. Together they developed a new helmet. The shape of the shell was modeled on structures such as the American PASGT helmet and the German Schubert helmet. The new aramid fabric used significantly improved ballistic properties. Fabric for the production of helmets wz. 2005 supplied by DuPont and Teijin.

Compared to previous helmet designs, the internal equipment of the helmet has also been changed. As in the case of Schubert's helmet, an insert made of a system of straps and mesh was used. After soldiers' comments, a newer, four-point version of the liner was introduced in 2008.

In the years 2023–2025, the Polish Army is to receive nearly 80,000 new wz. 2005 helmets. They would be eventually be replaced by the HP-04 and the Hełm HP-05.

== Users ==
- Poland: Used by the Polish Armed Forces.
- Ukraine: In February 2022, at least 42,000 wz. 2005 helmets were supplied to Ukraine.

== Gallery ==
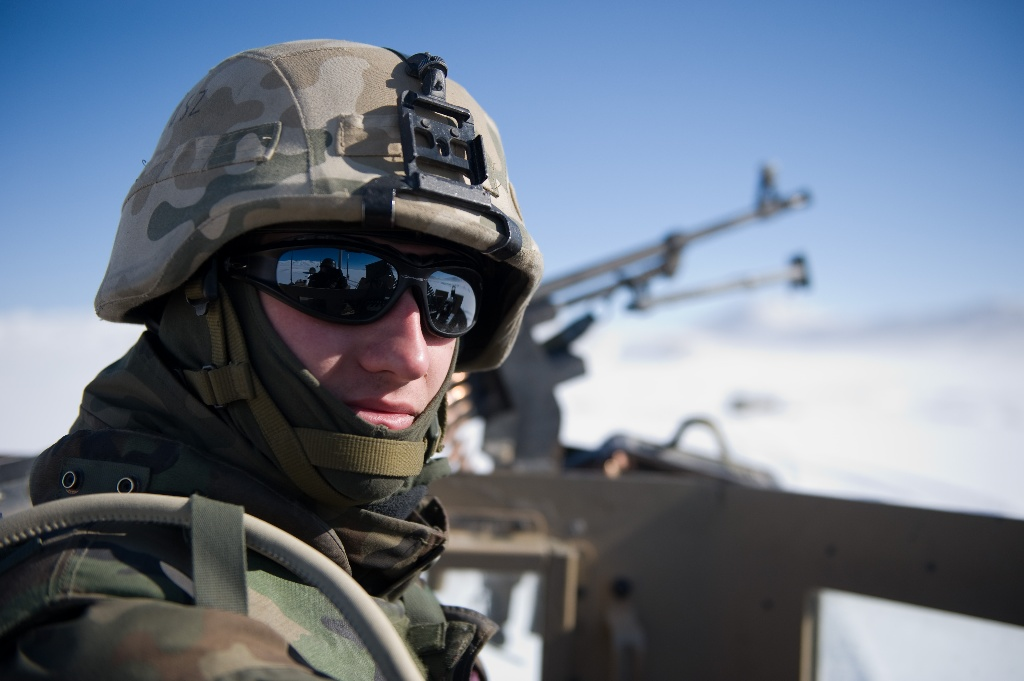
Polish soldier wearing wz. 2005 helmet in Afghanistan.

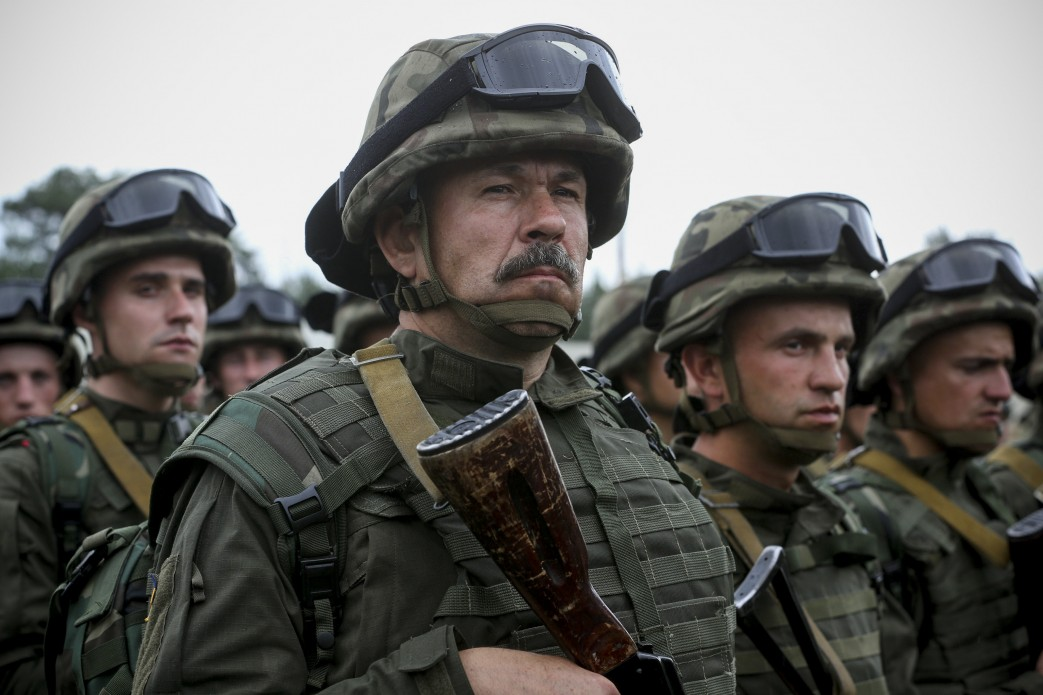
National Guard of Ukraine in 2016.
