= MP-6 gas mask =

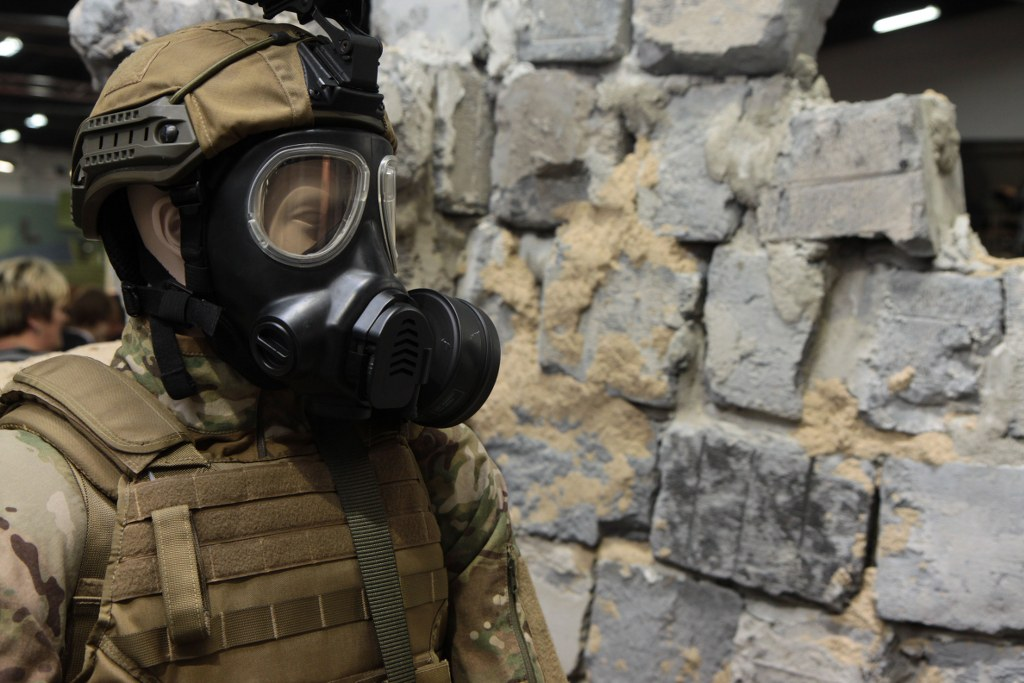
- MP-6 on a dummy model.
- Type: Gas mask
- Place of origin: Poland

Service history
- Used by: See Operators

Production history
- Designer: Maskpol
- Manufacturer: Maskpol
- No. produced: ~28,400

The MP-6 Gas Mask is a Polish military gas mask, which replaces the MP-5 masks.

== Design ==
The MP-6 mask (codenamed Apollo) is designed to protect the soldier's respiratory system from toxic warfare agents, radioactive dust and bacterial aerosols. In addition, the mask's design allows for the intake of fluid and conversation while wearing it.

The NATO standard filter (40 mm thread) is attached to the mask from the side (on the right, left or both sides, depending on the user's needs). The panoramic visor from the MP-5 mask is replaced by two smaller glasses. Additionally, the mask glasses are protected with polycarbonate ballistic lenses.

The fluid collection tube is NATO standard, allowing you to attach a water bottle, canteen or water bladder.

== Development ==
The mask is manufactured by Maskpol, a company belonging to the Polish Armaments Group. Maskpol previously also produced MP-5 masks.

The mask was presented at MSPO 2010, at MSPO 2011 (where it was awarded the DEFENDER statuette) and MSPO 2012.

On October 12, 2012, an agreement was signed between the Armament Inspectorate and Maskpol for the delivery of 28,400 MP-6 gas masks in the years 2012–2015. The cost of the masks is to be approximately PLN 21.1 million.

== Specifications ==
- Goggles: polyamide shrapnel-proof goggles (m=325 [mg], V=215 [m/s]
- mountable external laser protective lenses
- Shelf-life: Made from formulated hypoallergenic rubber with proven shelf-life of 15 years
- Water Usage: safe water intake port allowing for hydration in contaminated environment (>600cm3/5min)
- Inhalation: low CO_{2} content in inhalation air (<0.8%)
- Vision: possibility of mounting lenses for optical correction of vision
- Chemical warfare: over 24-hours’ protection against chemical warfare (CW) agents
- Weight: Total weight of a complete mask (with combined filter FP-6) less than 800 [g] (the largest size available)
- Filter: low breathing resistance with combined filter FP-6
- Size: Available in three sizes
- Communication: voicemitter providing effective communication

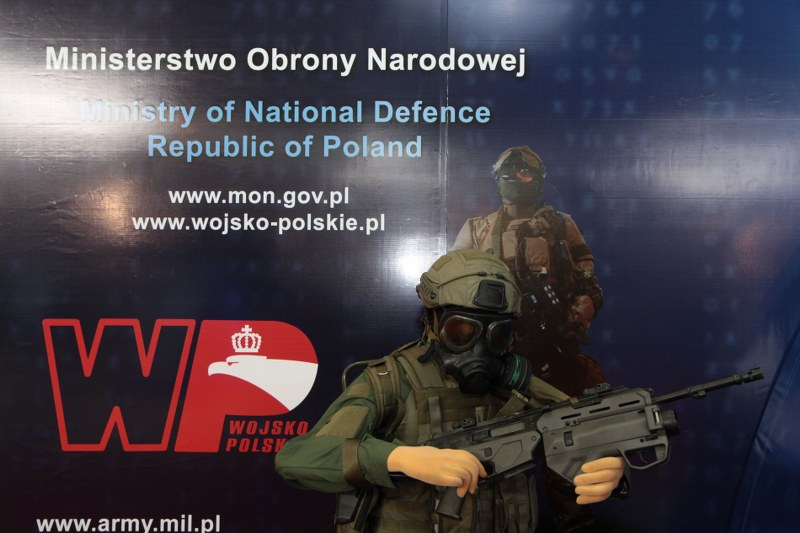
MP-6 gas mask at MSPO 2012

== Operators ==
- Poland - 28,400 gas masks purchased by the Polish Armed Forces.

== See also ==
MP-5 gas mask
