= MP-5 gas mask =

Polish military gas mask

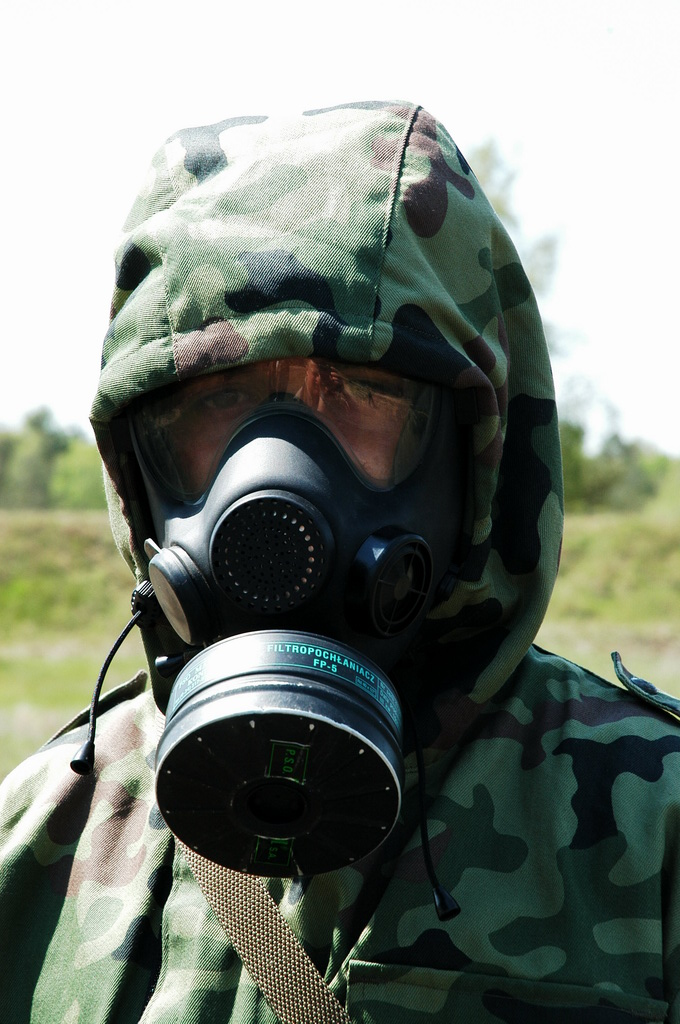
- MP-5 used by Polish soldier.
- Type: Gas mask
- Place of origin: Poland

Service history
- Used by: Poland; Ukraine

Production history
- Designer: Maskpol
- Manufacturer: Maskpol
- No. produced: ~110,000

The MP-5 gas mask is the standard gas mask of the Polish Armed Forces. This mask is designed to protect the user's respiratory tract from airborne toxic agents, radioactive dust and bacterial aerosols. For protection against toxic industrial agents such as ammonia or carbon monoxide, specific combined filters should be used additionally (connected in series with the basic FP-5 combined filter). The design also allows for the collection of fluids, and conversation.

The masks are currently manufactured by Maskpol.

== Development ==
In the mid-1980s, the Department of Respiratory Protection of the Military Institute of Chemistry and Radiometry in Warsaw began work on a new gas mask. It was to replace the previously introduced MP-4 masks. This study had the working name MP-5.

The first design had two screw-in absorbers (on the sides, which provided less inhalation resistance). It also had a headgear from the MP-4 mask and polycarbonate goggles. However, one absorber located centrally was ultimately used.

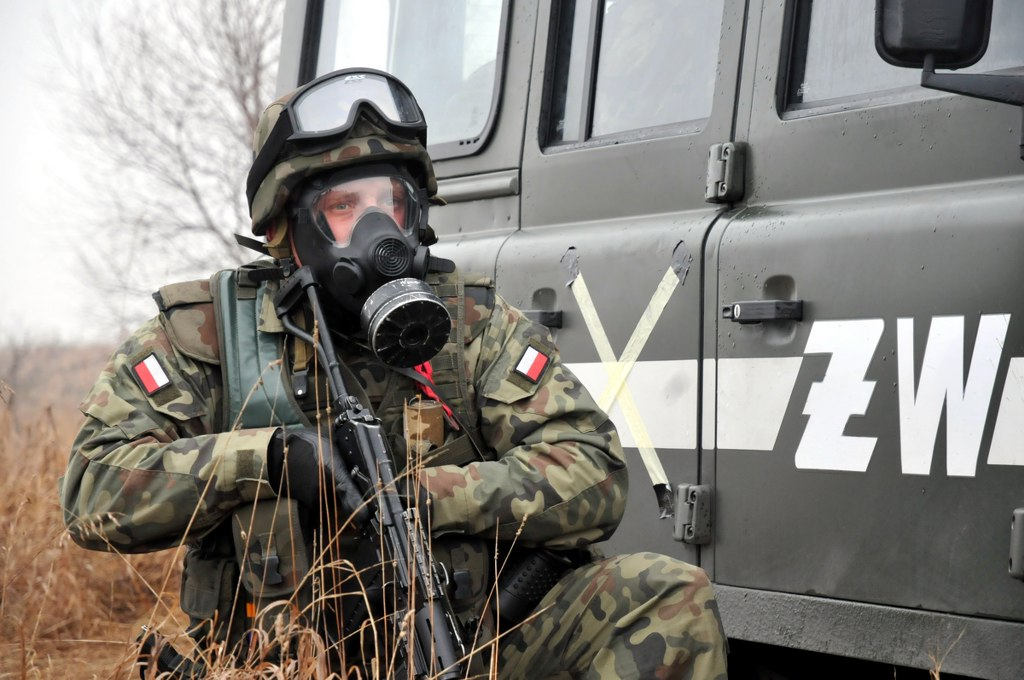
A soldier of the Military Police in an MP-5 mask

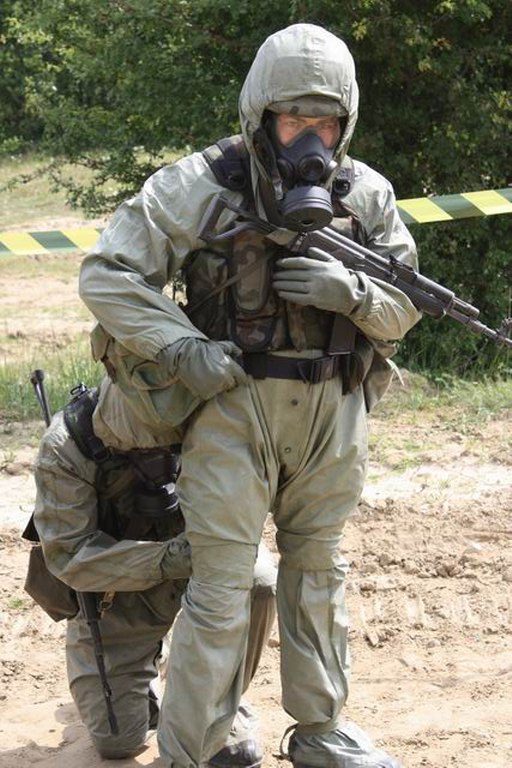
Polish soldier in MP-5 masks and OP-1 protective suit

== Specifications ==
=== Facial part ===
The face part of the mask is made of plastic. It has one large polyurethane visor[footnote needed]. The canister mounting socket is located in the lower part of the mask. On the right side of the mask is the service valve (for fluid administration and mask tightness testing in an uncontaminated atmosphere), and on the left is the exhalation valve.

=== Absorber ===
The mask is designed with an FP-5 filter (NATO standard thread). Other filters with NATO standard thread can also be used.

The composition of the set

The MP-5 gas mask is stored in the bag as follows:

- face part – main pocket
- filter absorber – main pocket
- filter absorber – main pocket
- bag straps – small side pocket
- lower side pocket is a place for the anti-chemical package

=== Sizes ===
The mask comes in 4 sizes:

- Size 1 – face height (Distance in a straight line from chin to nasal-temporal depression): over 127 mm
- Size 2 – face height: from 116 to 127 mm, face circumference (along the oval line, through the ears, chin and above the eyebrows) over 605 mm
- Size 3 – face height: from 116 to 127 mm, face circumference below 605 mm
- Size 4 – face height: below 116 mm

=== Technical parameters ===
Inspiratory resistance with continuous air flow at a rate of:

- 30 dm³/min – 175 Pa
- 160 dm³/min – 1500 Pa

Exhalation resistance with continuous air flow rate:

- 30 dm³/min – 80 Pa
- 160 dm³/min – 300 Pa

Mask weight (face part with filter):

- 800g

Patency of drinking device:

- 200 cm³/min

== Users ==
- Poland - Used by Polish Armed Forces, Police and Civil Defense.
- Ukraine - Used by Berkut in 2014.

== See also ==
- MP-6 gas mask
