= Konieczki, Silesian Voivodeship =

Konieczki
- Village
- Location within Poland
- Coordinates: 50°54′N 18°46′E
- Country: Poland
- Voivodeship: Silesian
- County: Kłobuck
- Gmina: Panki
- Population: 389

Konieczki [kɔˈɲɛt͡ʂki] is a village in the administrative district of Gmina Panki, within Kłobuck County, Silesian Voivodeship, in southern Poland.
