= Hełm HP-05 =

Polish combat helmet

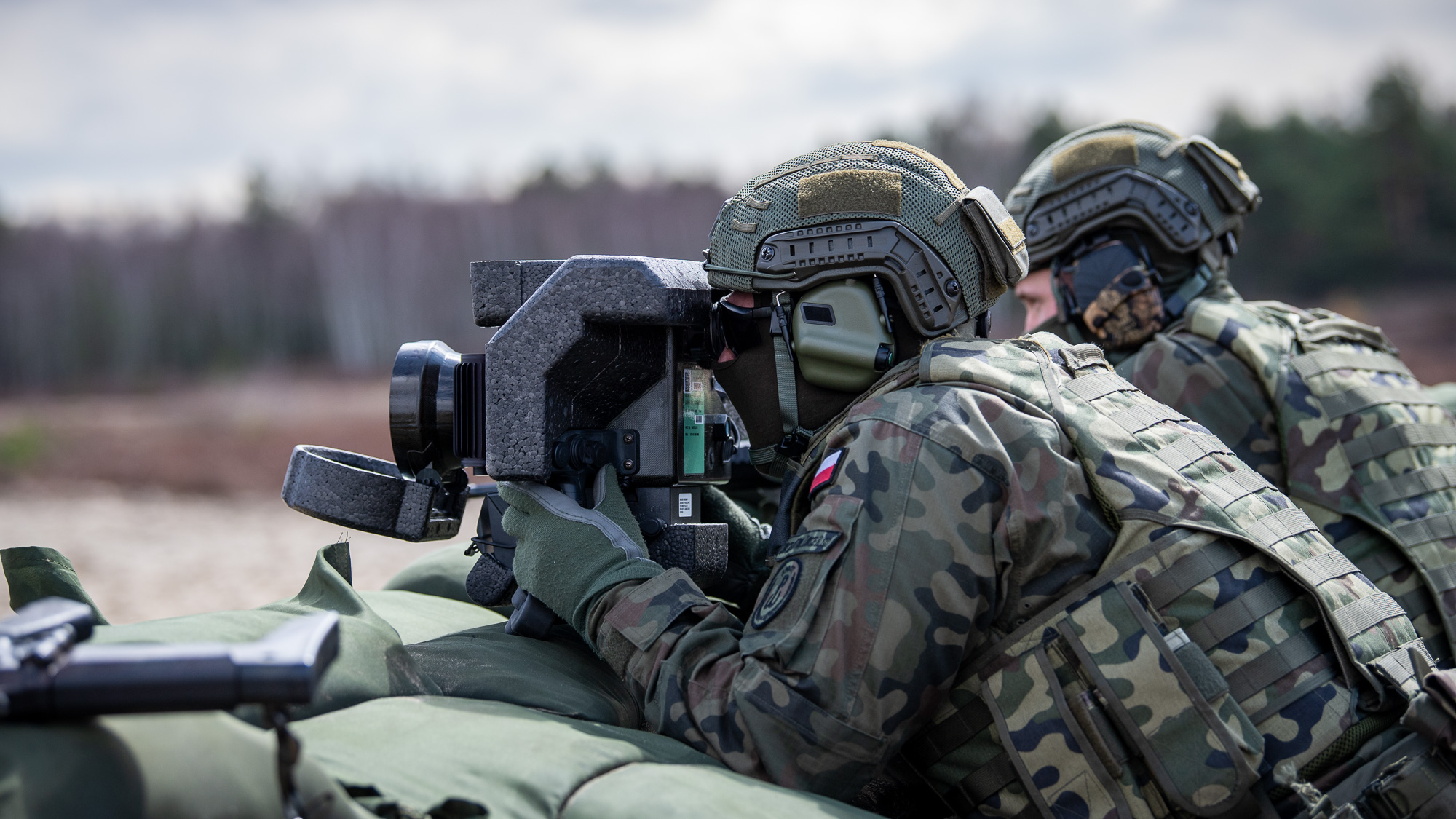
- Polish soldiers with the HP-05
- Type: Combat helmet
- Place of origin: Poland

Production history
- Designer: Maskpol
- Manufacturer: Maskpol
- Produced: 2020 - present
- No. produced: 50,000

Specifications
- Weight: 1.25–1.45 kg (2.76–3.20 lb)

The Hełm HP-05 is a high-cut ballistic helmet developed by Maskpol primarily for specialized units of the Polish Armed Forces as well as specialized law enforcement units. It is intended to shield the wearer's head from certain small arms fire and direct shrapnel. The HP-05 is the most recent helmet model developed for the Polish Armed Forces and is primarily utilized by special military and law enforcement units.

== History ==
The HP-05 is supplied to the Polish military since 2020.

== Specifications ==
- Bullet- and shrapnel-resistance:
  - V50 rating above 600 m/s (1,969 ft/s) for shrapnel up to 1.1 g (0.04 oz) (tested via NATO-standardized 'fragment simulating projectile') — Resists .357 Magnum jacketed soft-point bullets of 10.2 g (0.36 oz) at 410–440 m/s (1,345–1,444 ft/s) — Resists 9x19 mm full-metal jacket bullets of 8 g (0.28 oz) at 345–375 m/s (1,132–1,230 ft/s) — Otherwise complies with established Polish ballistic helmet standards (PN-V-87001:2011)
- Available in 3 sizes with a head circumference range of 54–62 cm (21.3–24.4 in)
- Fully-adjustable four-strap head harness
- Size-adjustable suspension system
- Made from high-tech ballistic and composite materials
- Helmet weight depending on size 1.25–1.45 kg (2.8–3.2 lb)
- Fitted with accessory rails and a mounting bracket for night vision goggles
- Compatible with: gas masks, filtering protective clothing, bulletproof vests, individual voice communication devices, and eye protection equipment

== Operators ==
- Poland: 50,000 have been received between 2020 and 2023. Up to 62,000 on order.

== Bibliography ==
- "BALLISTIC HELMET HP-05". www.maskpol.com.pl.
