= Maskpol =

Polish armament company

- Company type: Joint-stock company
- Headquarters: Konieczki, Silesian Voivodeship, Poland
- Key people: Adam Ogrodnik (President); Tomasz Jackiewicz (Director)
- Number of employees: 500
- Website: https://www.maskpol.com.pl/

Maskpol (full name Przedsiębiorstwo Sprzętu Ochronnego "Maskpol" S.A. (English: Security Equipment Company Maskpol" S.A.)) is a Polish company operating in the armament industry. The company is headquartered in the village of Konieczki, in the Silesian province, Kłobuck county.

The company was founded in the 1960s as Wytwórnia Sprzętu Komunikacyjnego "PZL Warszawa II" in Złochowice. Currently, it has the form of a joint-stock company and is part of the Polish Armaments Group.

== Products ==
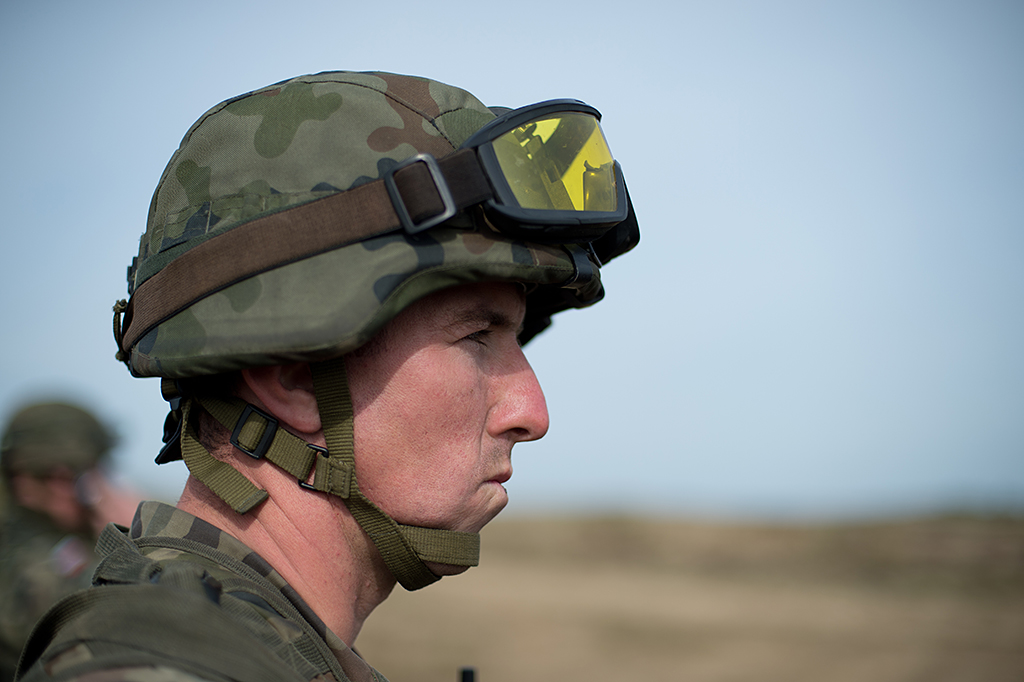
Helmet wz. 2005

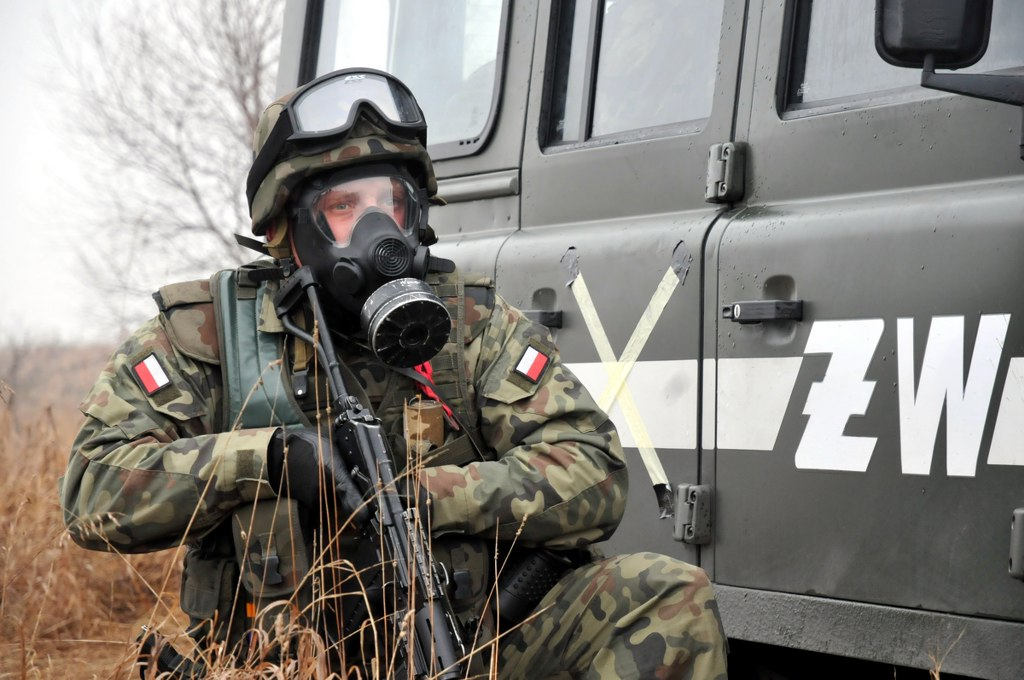
Military Police soldier in MP-5 mask

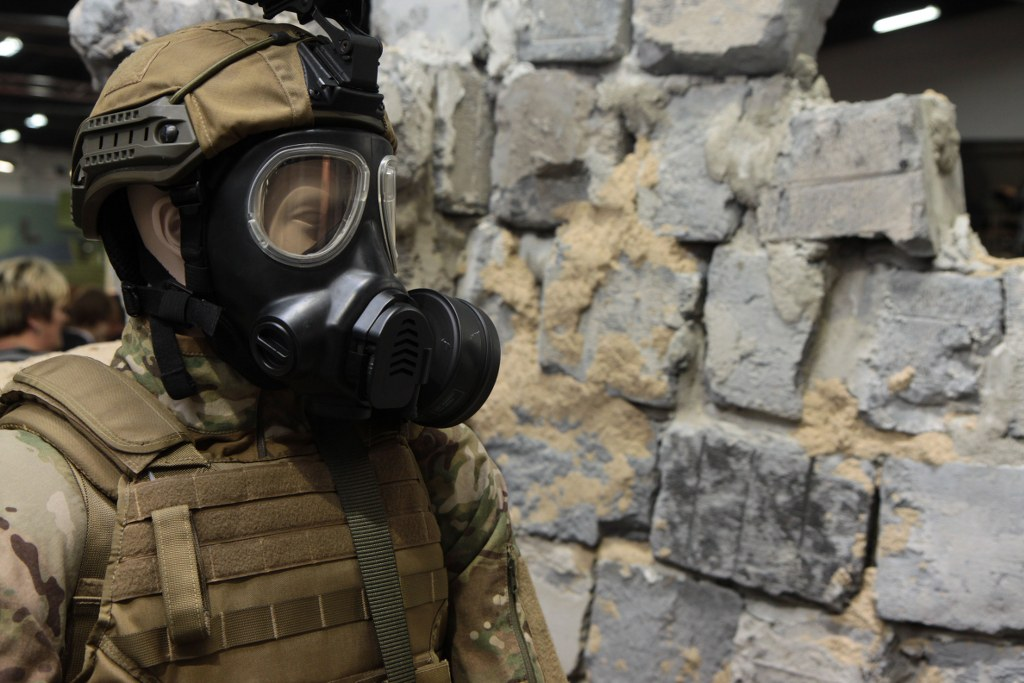
MP-6 mask at MSPO 2012

The main area of activity is the production of soldier equipment such as gas masks, combat helmet, bulletproof vests, filter clothing, protective clothing and contamination elimination devices, as well as other equipment for uniformed services, such as assault batons, shields, caltrops. Maskpol also conducts research and development work on new types and models of equipment.

The largest recipients of the company's products, as well as clients of research and development work, are the Polish Armed Forces and the Polish Police.

Some of Maskpol's products that constitute equipment for soldiers of the Polish Armed Forces:

- Helmet wz. 2000
- Helmet wz. 2005
- HA-03 landing helmet
- HP-05 helmet
- MP-5 gas mask
- MP-6 gas mask
- insulating and filtering protective clothing (e.g., FOO-1).

Police equipment includes, among others:

- Mich bulletproof helmet
- KPO-01 protective helmet
- mesh incapacitation kit
- road spike
- assault baton
- tonfa type baton

Maskpol also manufactures protective clothing for the civilian market.
