= OLV (anti-fragmentation vest) =

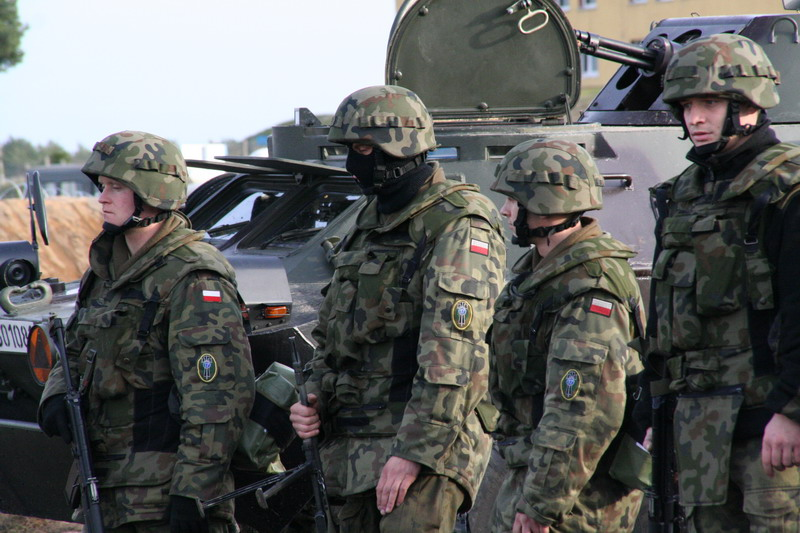
Polish soldiers using OLV vest

Kamizelka OLV – Polish bulletproof vest intended for soldiers of Polish Land Forces. In production since the early 1990s.

== Purpose ==
It protects against 9 mm Parabellum bullets (2nd class of bullet resistance according to the PN-V-87000:1999 standard), and there is also the possibility of using a steel plate at the front, which also protects against 7.62 mm bullets fired from the AKM kbk (4th class of bullet resistance according to the PN-V-87000:1999 standard). It is also equipped with a stand-up collar, shoulder pads and an attachable lower abdomen cover; it has shrapnel-proof properties.

The vest not only serves a protective role, but is also designed to carry additional equipment. It has 14 permanently sewn-in pockets (including 2 pockets for 2 magazines for AK/Beryl kbk, 1 pocket for a dressing, 1 for a radio, 2 for hand grenades). At the back, there is a place to attach an MP5 mask in a cover.

Weight of the vest with full inserts: 11.5 kg. The vest was produced in panther camouflage in forest and desert variants.

== Major drawbacks of the Vest ==
OLV vests were used by UNPROFOR and PKW Iraq soldiers, among others. Users reported a number of comments, including: too much weight compared to similar designs used by other armies, non-ergonomic placement of pockets, and loose pocket closures.

== Operators ==
- (Poland) Polish armed Forces : OLV vests are currently in the process of being modernised with molle straps and put to reserve use.
- Ukraine Armed Forces: In 2014, Ukrainian volunteers bought OLV vests to use them during the ongoing war in Donbas.

== See also ==
- Improved Outer Tactical Vest
