= CAMM (missile family) =

Family of surface-to-air missiles developed by MBDA UK

CAMM (Common Anti-Air Modular Missile)
- An MBDA computer generated graphic showing a CAMM missile in flight
- Type: Anti-aircraft and anti-missile missile
- Place of origin: United Kingdom; United Kingdom & Italy (CAMM-ER); United Kingdom & Poland (CAMM-MR)

Service history
- In service: Royal Navy – 2018; Royal New Zealand Navy – 2020; British Army – 2021; Chilean Navy– 2022; Brazilian Navy – 2025
- Wars: Red Sea crisis

Production history
- Designer: MBDA UK; MBDA (CAMM-ER)
- Designed: 2004

Specifications
- Mass: CAMM: Missile: 99 kg (218 lb); In a launch canister: 181 kg (399 lb); CAMM-ER: Missile: 166 kg (366 lb); In a launch canister: 250 kg (550 lb)
- Length: CAMM: Missile: 3.2 m (10 ft 6 in); Launch canister: 3.4 m (11 ft 2 in); CAMM-ER: Missile: 4.2 m (13 ft 9 in); Launch canister: 4.4 m (14 ft 5 in)
- Diameter: CAMM: Missile: 166 mm (6.5 in); Launch canister (square): 275 mm (10.8 in); CAMM-ER: Missile: 190 mm (7.5 in); Launch canister (square): 275 mm (10.8 in)
- Wingspan: 450 mm (18 in)
- Warhead: High-explosive blast fragmentation warhead with laser proximity and impact fuze
- Warhead weight: 10 kg (22 lb)
- Engine: Solid-fuel rocket motor
- Operational range: CAMM: > 25 km (16 mi); CAMM-ER: > 45 km (28 mi); CAMM-MR: > 100 km (62 mi)
- Flight altitude: CAMM & CAMM-ER: 10,000 m (33,000 ft)
- Maximum speed: Mach 3 (1,029 m/s; 3,376 ft/s)
- Guidance system: Inertial guidance system with mid-course update and active radar terminal homing
- Steering system: Four folding cruciform wings
- References: Janes

The CAMM (Common Anti-Air Modular Missile) is a family of surface-to-air missiles developed by MBDA UK for the United Kingdom. CAMM is derived from, and shares some common features and components with, the Advanced Short-Range Air-to-Air Missile (ASRAAM), but with updated electronics, a soft vertical launch system, and an active radar homing seeker. The CAMM family is in use by or on order for the armed forces of several countries.

In the Royal Navy, CAMM, the point and local area defence variant with a range of greater than 25 kilometres (16 mi), is part of the Sea Ceptor air defence system which replaced the Sea Wolf missiles on Type 23 frigates starting from 2018. As of 2023, it was planned to equip both the Type 26 and Type 31 frigates planned for 2028, and to replace Aster 15 on the Type 45 destroyer. In the British Army, CAMM forms the interceptor component of the Sky Sabre/Land Ceptor air defence system, which replaced the Rapier missile from 2021. The development of CAMM is also contributing to the updating of ASRAAM in service with the Royal Air Force.

An extended-range version of the CAMM (CAMM-ER) was in the final stages of development by the UK and Italy as of 2023. It is capable of reaching targets over 45 kilometres (28 mi) away. Brazil's Avibras announced in 2014 in partnership with MBDA that it was to develop the similar 40 kilometres (25 mi)+ ranged MV-AMA (AVibras Medium Altitude Missile) based on the CAMM for its Astros 2020 MLRS and naval platforms. A larger CAMM-MR (medium-range) missile with a range of over 100 kilometres (62 mi) was being developed by the UK and Poland in 2022, to equip Polish Wicher-class frigates and Wisła air defence systems.

== Development ==
=== Research and development timeline ===
The Common Anti-Air Modular Missile has its roots in a Technology Demonstration Programme (TDP), jointly funded by MBDA and the Ministry of Defence (MoD) as part of the United Kingdom's Future Local Area Air Defence System (FLAADS). FLAADS is part of a wider UK "Team Complex Weapons" (UK Industrial partnership of companies such as MBDA and Thales UK) programme to deliver a variety of weapons and maintain UK sovereign capability in this area. FLAADS is intended to deliver a common weapons platform, CAMM, to equip forces in the air, land and maritime environments. During the early stages of the FLAADS programme, requirements were identified for the new missile to meet both current and anticipated threats, namely "airborne targets which are typified by high speed, rapid evasive manoeuvres, low signatures and advanced countermeasure[s]."

Phase 1 of the TDP worked on technologies for soft vertical launch, the low-cost active radar seeker, a dual-band two-way data link and a programmable open systems architecture. Phase 2 began in 2008 and covered the manufacture of flight-worthy subsystems, mid-course guidance firings and captive airborne seeker trials on a Qinetiq Andover experimental aircraft. The Soft Vertical Launch was proven over a series of trials starting from 2003, culminating in a successful soft launch of a complete missile in May 2011. In January 2012 the MoD awarded MBDA a £483 million contract to develop FLAADS (Maritime) to replace Sea Wolf missiles on Type 23 frigates now known as Sea Ceptor.

In 2013, MBDA and Thales UK outlined in a press release the scale of their cooperation on the development of both CAMM and FLAADS. Manufacturing work valuing £1 million had been placed at Thales' Belfast site, including for elements such as internal thermal management modelling, structural analysis, and precision manufacturing of a number of missile components. MBDA and Thales were also exploring on other areas such as the provision of in-service support to CAMM users. Thales' Basingstoke site were also exploring two pilot programs covering missile safety and arming units and intelligent fuzes, in cooperation with MBDA. The Basingstoke site had already been contracted in 2012 to supply CAMM with laser proximity fuzes under an £11 million contract.

Throughout this development, ASRAAM was used as the base design for the future missile but with new software, a turnover pack, folding fins, an RF seeker, and data-link added to facilitate the required capabilities. Other components beyond those directly from ASRAAM were reused from other programs such as the command and control software which reuses around 70% of that developed for the Principal Anti-Air Missile System (PAAMS) on board the Type 45 destroyers as well as some internal electronic components from the Sea Wolf Block 2 missiles. In return, some of the technologies and components developed for CAMM were used to upgrade ASRAAM as part of the Block 6 upgrade. Overall, development costs were reduced by a using modular design and minimised complexity.

In January 2015, the MoD announced that it had signed a development and manufacturing deal with MBDA in late December 2014.

=== Trial ===
In September 2017, the first successful Sea Ceptor (CAMM) firing occurred at sea from the Type 23 frigate, HMS Argyll. On 24 June 2021, MBDA announced that CAMM-ER had completed its first successful live-firing in late 2020 from a range in Italy.

=== Production ===
On 13 March 2024, it was announced that MBDA was seeking to triple the monthly production rate of the CAMM family of missiles from 2022 to 2026. Furthermore, MBDA would double production capacity of its Bolton facility in the UK and create a second final assembly line for CAMM-ER in Italy.

== Characteristics ==
The main variants of the CAMM family utilise a number of common features.

The missiles' guidance system uses a combination of two-way data link for in-flight guidance and retargeting, and an active RF seeker, using gallium nitride (GaN) solid-state power amplifier technology, for terminal guidance (lock-on after launch) providing high performance in all weather conditions. As missiles can receive guidance inputs over data link, targeting data through to the missile's terminal phase can be provided by the fire-control channel(s) present on modern 3D radar systems, removing any requirement for a ship or ground-based air-defence system (GBAD) to incorporate dedicated fire-control or radar illuminator systems, helping to reduce system cost, weight, and maintenance requirements. This also allows the use of targeting data from a much greater variety of sources, for instance, if a ship's combat management system or a GBAD's command post is compatible with wider battlefield data-link systems (e.g. NATO's Link 16) then connected assets including aircraft or other air defence systems can contribute targeting data. This guidance combination reportedly allows a high rate of fire against multiple simultaneous targets (saturation attacks) and against a "wide target set" with missiles also described as having a "modest" surface-to-surface capability. However, there are concerns that the increased use of data link may make the system more vulnerable to electronic warfare measures.

CAMM also incorporates a cold launch system referred to as Soft Vertical Launch (SVL). Unlike the more traditional hot launch method whereby a missile would use its own rocket motor to leave its launch cell, SVL uses a gas generator to pneumatically eject the missile from its canister while a turn-over pack on the missile body orients the missile directly towards the target before engaging its rocket motor and accelerating for interception. Whilst still providing 360° coverage around the launch system, the unique benefits of this launch method include:

- Increased maximum interception range by saving all the rocket motor's energy to power the intercept.
- Reduced minimum intercept range by reducing the turn-over arc required of the missile after launch which would otherwise bleed valuable energy (reportedly saving 30% of launch weight).
- Reduced stress on launch platforms and the removal of most efflux management concerns which allows for both reduced launcher maintenance, lighter and more compact launcher options, and greater freedom of launching locations, for instance, the increased feasibility of firing the missiles from wooded or urban areas.
- Reduced risks from missile malfunction as there is little risk of the missile being stuck in the launcher with a burning rocket motor and damage the launcher and surrounding missiles.
- Reduced launch signature (visual / infrared) for better launch platform concealment (also potentially enables the physical camouflaging of the launcher) and reduced sensor obstruction post-firing.

The CAMM family are described as having a maintenance-free design throughout the missile's shelf life of reportedly 10 or 20 years, with munitions remaining safely sealed in their launch canisters until firing. CAMM's software utilises open-systems architecture allowing for both easier integration with new sensors and combat management systems but also general upgrades throughout its service life. Additionally, all CAMM munitions are rated as Insensitive munition compliant for improved platform survivability in the event of damage.

The missiles of the CAMM family can be used interchangeably by both naval and ground-based air defence systems allowing for common usage and shared munition stockpiles between military branches.

=== Ground-based air defence (Land Ceptor) ===
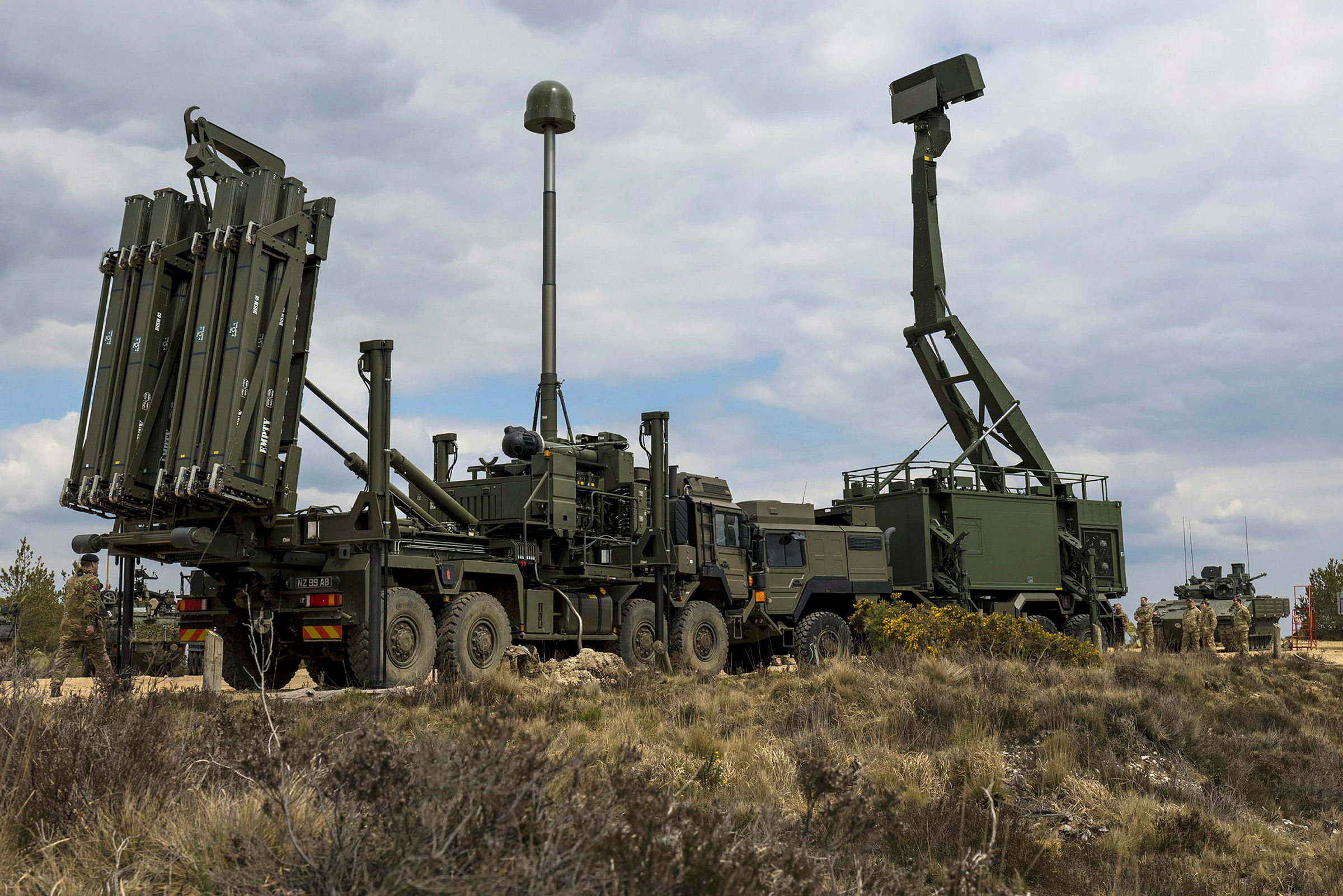
British Army Sky Sabre defence system with iLauncher and Giraffe radar in the background

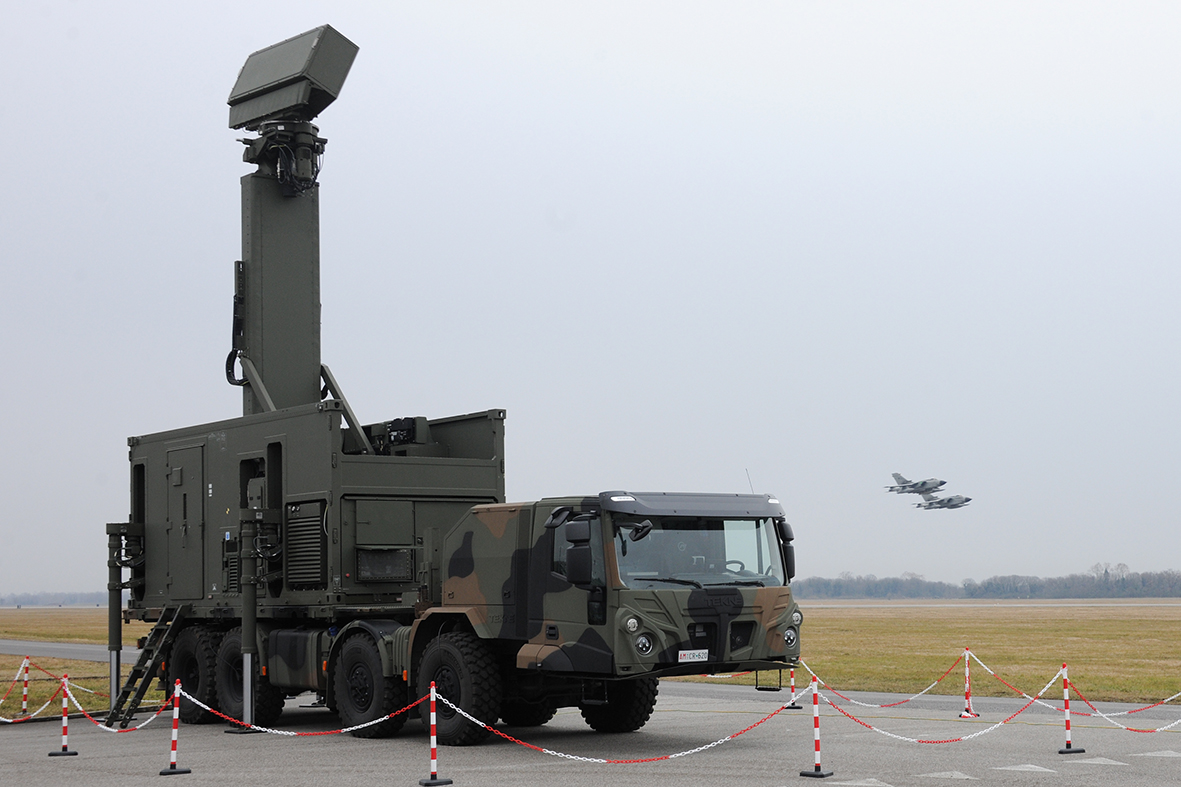
KRONOS LAND AESA radar of the Italian MAADS (Medium Advanced Air Defence System)

The land application of CAMM is marketed as the "Enhanced Modular Air Defence Solutions" (EMADS) package or "Land Ceptor".

The system utilises MBDA's Intelligent Launcher (iLauncher), a scalable, palletised erector launcher for up to eight CAMM or CAMM-ER missiles and mounted to an 8x8 vehicle of choice. iLauncher provides the two-way data link for the missiles in-flight and can also optionally integrate an electro-optical targeting system for passive target acquisition within line of sight of the launcher. Additionally, iLauncher is capable of self-loading/unloading missile racks via a hook system or change individual missile canisters with the assistance of a crane (This reportedly allows for missiles to be loaded in half the time as required for Rapier). It is also fitted with its own power supply allowing it to be dismounted from the parent vehicle and operated remotely if necessary, as well as mounting onboard test-equipment for streamlined maintenance. iLauncher has evolved considerably from its initial concept in the early 2010s. The first iterations of the system were seen mounted on MAN 4x4 trucks, loaded with two racks of six missiles (12 missiles total), a small crane, an early version of the data link mast and considerably fewer auxiliary components compared to the final product.

As part of EMADS, CAMM and iLauncher are designed to be integrated with a customer's choice of command and radar systems, as well as wider battlespace management systems such as Northrop Grumman's Integrated Air and Missile Defence (IAMD) Battle Command System (IBCS). Additionally, by using data link, the various component systems of EMADS (launchers, sensors, command systems) do not require physical connectors such as cables to be established between them, allowing a battery or fire-group to deploy and redeploy more rapidly but also allowing for components to be spaced apart out to a reported distance of 15 kilometres (9.3 mi) for improved survivability.

=== Naval-based air defence (Sea Ceptor) ===
The naval application of CAMM is marketed as "Sea Ceptor". CAMM can be integrated on vessels as small as 50 metres (160 ft) such as in/offshore patrol vessels or on larger surface combatants (destroyers and frigates), only requiring the internal installation of the necessary computing systems as well as above-deck aerials for the two-way data link for the missiles, and is designed to be easily integrated with a ship's combat management system.

CAMM's soft vertical launch capability with the resultant removal of most efflux management concerns aboard ships enables the use of a variety of shipborne launching options.

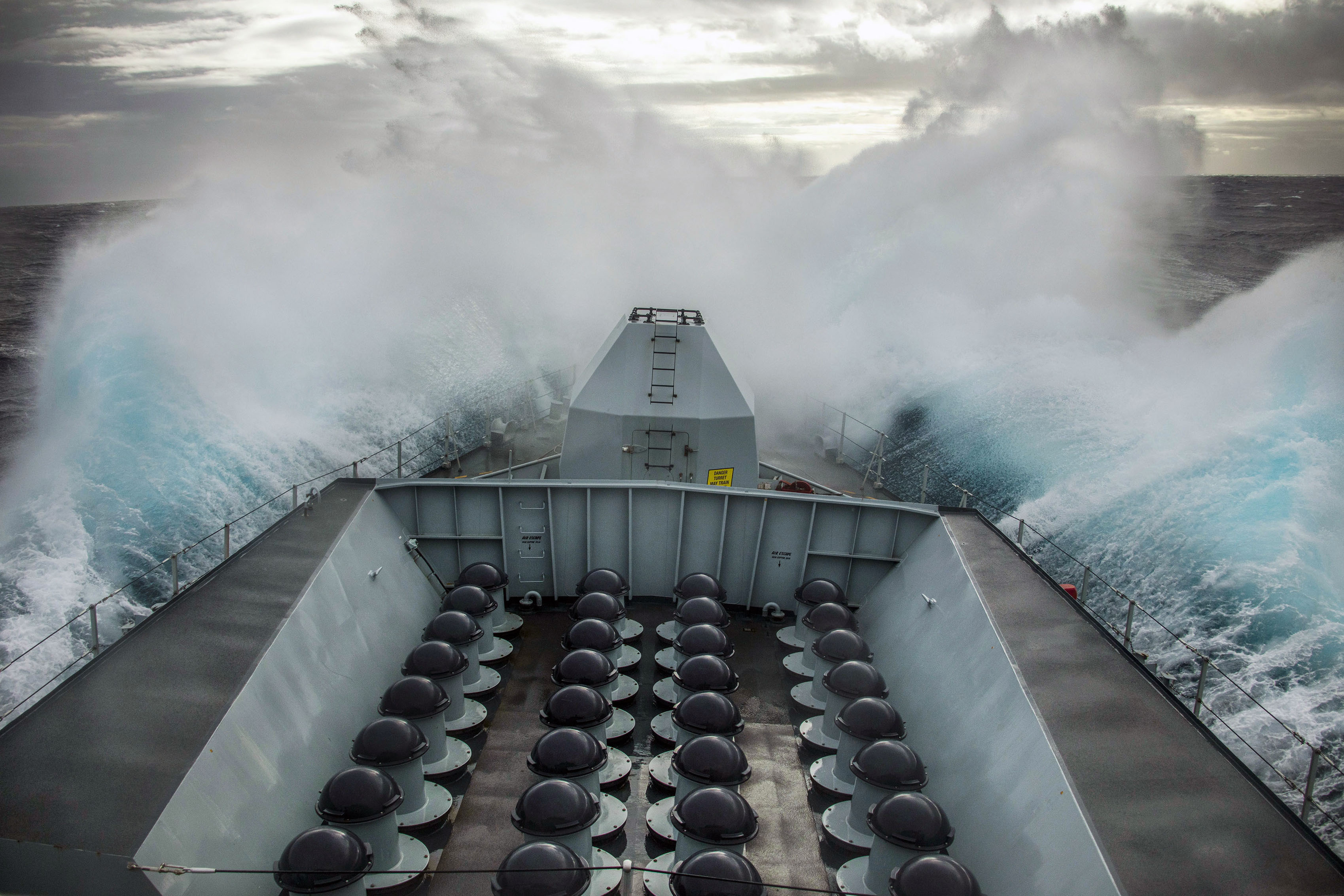
32-cell 'Mushroom Farm' on the British Type 23 frigate HMS Lancaster. Note the black protective caps on each cell.

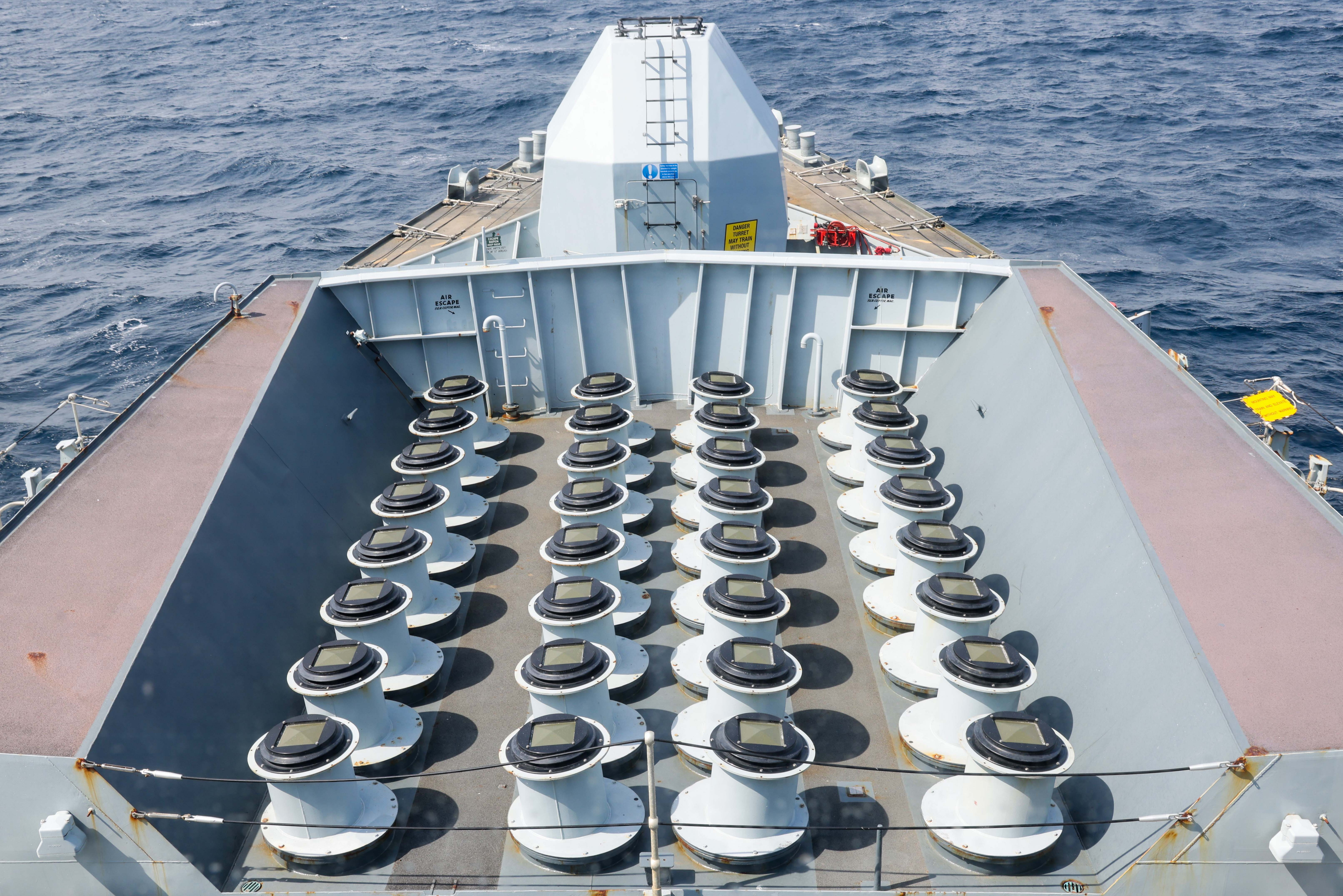
British Type 23 frigate HMS Richmond during the Red Sea crisis. Black protective caps have been removed to permit missile firings.

The low cost, low weight, option is CAMM's own vertical launch canisters (colloquially known as "mushroom farms" due to the appearance of the protective cover used to protect the protruding cells when not in combat) which use a lengthened and modified version of the vertical launch cells used on the Type 23 frigates. (Note: The cap covering the cells must be removed prior to firing.) A more modular version of this launcher arrangement was later developed, utilising six-cell launch modules.

Alternately, following integration with the Host Extensible Launching System (ExLS), CAMM, CAMM-ER and CAMM-MR can be packed into the larger multi-role Mark 41 or Mark 57 vertical launching systems, providing a launching system which is much more compact and with greater missile capacity (multiple missiles can be packed into each individual launch cell), though heavier and more expensive. The ExLS product line also has a stand-alone three-cell launch module that can provide tactical-length launch capabilities comparable to the Mark 41, but in a lighter and smaller package, as a middle-ground launcher option for CAMM and CAMM-ER. Naval Group are developing a similar cold-launch system with capacity for 24 CAMM or CAMM-ER that will be designed for use aboard the FDI frigate in the export market. The system would use the French Sylver vertical launching system.

== Variants ==
=== Main variants ===
==== CAMM ====
The point defence and local-area defence variant. CAMM weighs 99 kg (218 lb), is 3.2 m (10 ft 6 in) in length, and is 166 mm (6.5 in) in diameter. Incorporating the same rocket motor from ASRAAM, CAMM has a flight altitude of 10 km (6.2 mi) and reported minimum operational range of less than 1 kilometre (0.62 mi) and a maximum range greater than 25 km (16 mi), although IHS Jane's reported that trials had shown the missile having a capability of traveling up to 60 km (37 mi). These ranges are significantly greater than both the 1–10 kilometres (0.62–6.21 mi) range of Sea Wolf and the 8.2 kilometres (5.1 mi) range of Rapier that CAMM would replace. Can be quad-packed.

==== CAMM-ER (Extended-Range) ====
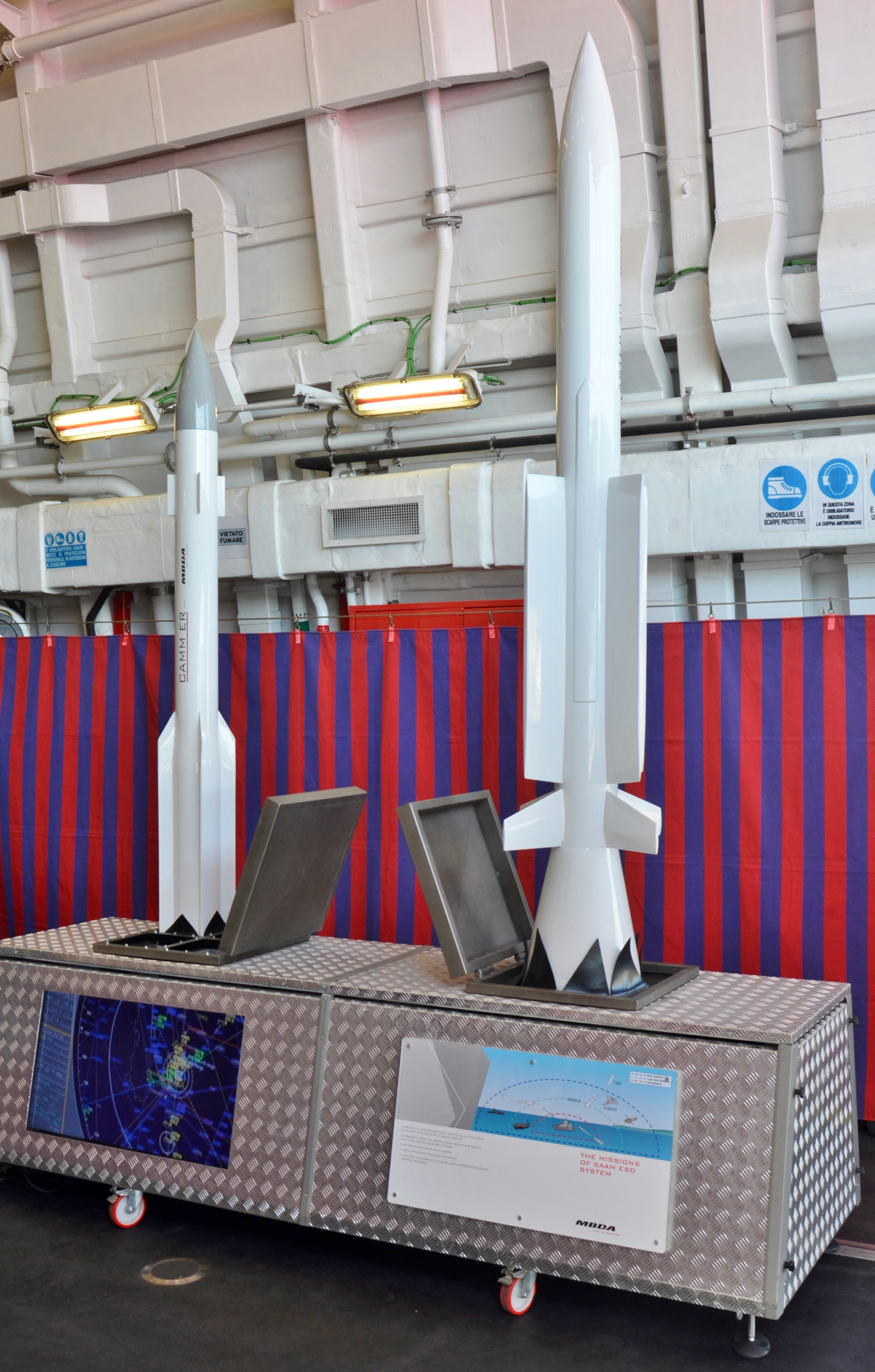
Mock-up of a quad-packed CAMM-ER missile (left) and an Aster 30 missile (right), in the hangar of Italian frigate Carabiniere.

The extended-range point and local-area defence variant. Under development with MBDA and Avio for the Italian Ministry of Defence since 2013. CAMM-ER weighs 160 kg (350 lb), is 4.2 metres (14 feet) in length, and is 190 mm (7.5 in) diameter. Other than the increased dimensions and alongside the addition of strakes and fins to the body as well as a slightly redesigned seeker radome, CAMM-ER utilises a new Avio rocket motor enabling a range in excess of 40–45 kilometres (25–28 mi), although these ranges are reported as conservative, and a flight altitude of 10 km (6.2 mi). Can be quad-packed.

==== CAMM-MR (Medium-Range) ====
An area defence variant with a range in excess of 100 kilometres (62 mi) being developed in partnership between MBDA UK and PGZ as of 2023 as part of the wider 2030 UK-Poland Strategic Partnership. The missile is being primarily developed for Polish requirements as a lower-cost, locally producible missile to complement the existing PAC-3 MSE within the Wisła system, as well as to have a single medium-range missile that can be used by both ground based air defence assets and the Polish Navy's Wicher-class frigates. Whilst there is currently little information on the missile's overall characteristics aside range, official images of the munition shows two missiles loaded into a single Mark 41 cell making CAMM-MR the first munition of this range class capable of being dual-packed into the Mark 41 Vertical Launching System, enabling 16 missiles to be carried by a single Mk 41 eight-cell launch module.

=== Additional variants ===
The MV-AMA (AVibras Medium-Altitude Missile) is a Brazilian variant of CAMM under development since 2014 to meet the needs of the Brazilian Army's 'Strategic Anti-Aircraft Defence Program'. The missile is expected to have a range of 40 kilometres (25 mi), up to an altitude of 15 kilometres (9.3 mi) and designed to be compatible with the Astros 2020 multiple rocket launcher as well as naval platforms. The program is expected to have 70% sovereign Brazilian industrial contribution.

=== Related developments ===
Technologies derived from both CAMM and Brimstone are also being used in the development of the Land Precision Strike Missile for the British Army, an 80–150 kilometres (50–93 mi) ranged surface-to-surface missile designed to complement the GMLRS-ER for use against high-value and moving targets from the M270 MLRS. Marketing material shows that missile is also expected to be compatible with iLauncher among other potential launch platforms.

== Operational history ==
=== United Kingdom ===
==== Royal Navy ====
MBDA, as lead contractor, received an £851 million contract to integrate CAMM on the Type 23 frigates with a planned in-service date of November 2016. Sea Ceptor entered operational service in May 2018, with HMS Argyll being the first Type 23 frigate to deploy with the system. The Type 23 has de-risked the integration of Sea Ceptor (also referred to as GWS-35) by retaining a modified version of its existing 32-cell vertical launch system for Sea Wolf which is lengthened to accommodate the longer CAMM; this was opposed to MBDA's alternate proposal of introducing a new 12-cell ExLS complex for 48 quad-packed missiles.

The Anti-Air-Warfare Officer of the Type 23 Frigate HMS Westminster said after test firings "Westminster managed to explore the real potential of the system during her training and to say it is a real game changer is an understatement. Unlike its predecessor [Sea Wolf], the system is capable of defending ships other than Westminster herself. Whether it's engaging multiple air threats or fast incoming attack craft, Sea Ceptor represents a massive capability upgrade for the Type 23 frigate."

The Royal Navy's future Type 26 and Type 31 frigates (replacing the Type 23s) will be fitted with Sea Ceptor when they enter service in the late 2020s. A £128 million contract was signed with MBDA to integrate CAMM on to the Type 26 frigates with a planned completion date of December 2019. The Type 26 had previously been shown as having 2x24-cell mushroom farm launch complexes for CAMM located forward and amidships (four 6-cell modules each) for a total 48x Sea Ceptors; however, the Royal Navy's website now describes the Type 26 as being fitted with a 12-cell vertical launch system and 24 Mk41 launcher cells.

The Type 31 has had a number of revisions to its vertical launch system. Initially the Arrowhead 140 design (which would later be selected for the Type 31) was depicted being fitted with a single bulk mushroom farm for 24 missiles. In 2020 this arrangement was revised for the modular mushroom farm launcher with two 6-cell modules for a total of 12 missiles, with the noticeable reduction of missiles possibly being a cost-saving measure. On 21 May 2023, First Sea Lord Sir Ben Key announced that Royal Navy intends to fit the Type 31s with their previously fitted-for-but-not-with 32-cell Mark 41 vertical launch systems to provide them additional firepower and will likely see ships hosting at least 32x missiles quad-packed into one of their four eight-cell launch modules.

In July 2021, MBDA was awarded a contract to integrate Sea Ceptor onto the six Type 45 destroyers between 2026 and 2032. 24x CAMM cells (four 6-cell modules) are expected to be mounted forward of the existing 48-cell Sylver launcher to fulfil the short-range air defence role currently performed by Aster 15 missiles. This will allow a total of 48 long-ranged Aster 30s to be carried in their place and bring a 50% increase in the ship's overall missile capacity.

CAMM saw its first official combat use with the Royal Navy on the morning of 9 March 2024 when HMS Richmond destroyed two Houthi drones during the Red Sea crisis with an unspecified number of missiles.

==== British Army ====
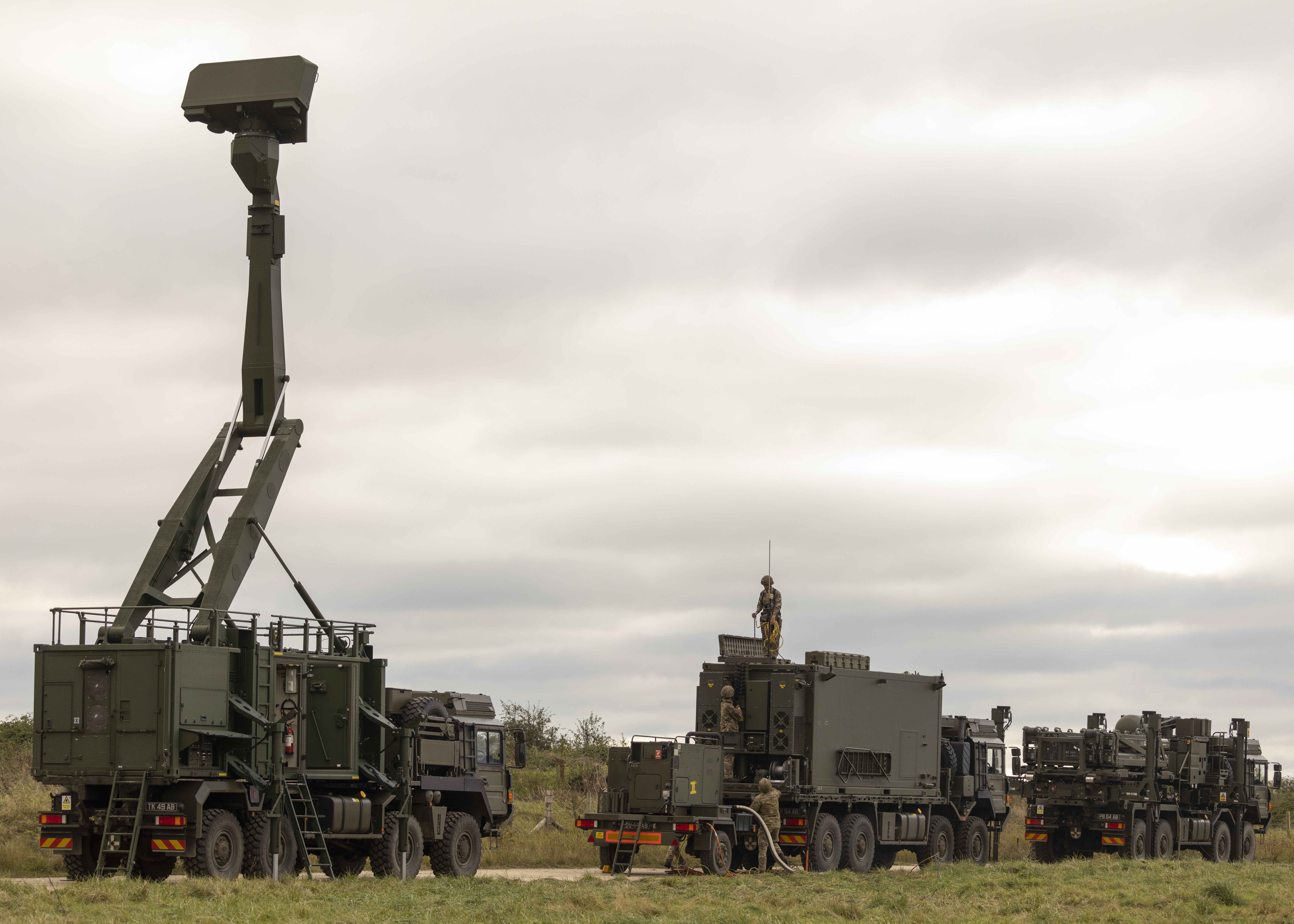
A Sky Sabre air defence missile system of the Royal Artillery. (from left to right: Giraffe radar, command vehicle, iLauncher)

The British Army's CAMM-based air defence system is known as Sky Sabre. Rafael, the lead contractor for the programme, was awarded a £618 million contract in 2016 for the delivery of the system with a planned in-service date of March 2020.

Sky Sabre consists of three main components: MBDA iLaunchers loaded with CAMM, the Surface to Air Missile Centre (SAMOC) which runs on Rafael's Modular Integrated C4I Air & Missile Defence System (MIC4AD) as used on Israel's Iron Dome, and Saab's Giraffe Agile Multi-Beam (GAMB) passive-electronically scanned array radar. GAMB operates in the C-band and provides Sky Sabre with 360° radar coverage at up to 70° elevation and out 120 kilometres (75 mi) range. The radar itself is raised 12 metres (39 ft) above its parent vehicle to give better detection of low level threats and greater freedom in system deployment by allowing the array to look over obstacles such as buildings or treelines. All of these components are mounted on MAN HX77 8x8 heavy utility trucks and can all be dismounted from their parent vehicles if required.

Sky Sabre is operated by 16 Regiment Royal Artillery (16 RA) under the command of 7 Air Defence Group. Land Ceptor provides Sky Sabre and the British Army with over three times the range of the preceding Rapier system. Major Tim Oakes, Senior Training Officer for the Sky Sabre training programme is quoted as saying: "Sky Sabre is so accurate and agile that it is capable of hitting a tennis ball-sized object travelling at the speed of sound. In fact, it can control the flight of 24 missiles simultaneously whilst in flight, guiding them to intercept 24 separate targets. It is an amazing capability."

On 1 July 2021, it was revealed that Sky Sabre had started acceptance trials and training with the Royal Artillery and that it would be deployed to the Falkland Islands would occur "late summer/early autumn [2021]". Sky Sabre had its initial operating capability declared on 8 October 2021 with the first systems delivered by the Defence Equipment & Support Agency (DE&S) to the 7th Air Defence Group in December 2021 before being formally declared operational in January 2022. During the same month, Sky Sabre's first deployment was announced to the Falklands replacing the existing Rapier missile deployment.

In March 2022, the UK announced it would be deploying a Sky Sabre fire group to Poland to bolster NATO's Eastern flank following the 2022 Russian invasion of Ukraine dubbed Operation Stifftail. On 13 March 2024, Minister of Defence Grant Shapps announced on social media that Operation Stifftail would formally be extended. It eventually concluded in December 2024.

On 22 August 2025, the MoD and DE&S announced a £118 million, three-year contract to MBDA for six new Land-Ceptor missile launchers (iLaunchers) for use in Sky Sabre. The contract would also include the provision of suite supporting equipment including 12 fire unit support vehicles for ammunition, eight vehicles for baggage, eight threat evaluation and weapon assignment systems, in addition to a supply of spare parts for the launchers and Sky Sabre. It also came with a commitment from to double the number of deployable Sky Sabre systems. As part of the press-release It was also announced that the first live-firing of the system from within the UK took place at the Outer Hebrides range during Exercise Formidable Shield earlier that year.

However, this announcement continued long-standing confusion regarding both the composition of Sky Sabre units and the current deployable strength of the UK's medium-range air defence capability. In January 2025 it was reported that the UK had seven Sky Sabre systems and that it was looking to purchase more, possibly increasing to nine. However, the MoD have been accused of being vague and inconsistent in their use of terminology regarding Sky Sabre, specifically their use of the term 'system', making it unclear if and when they are referring to the composite components of Sky Sabre or the deployable units that operate the overall system. Currently 16 RA has four batteries for Sky Sabre (11 Battery, 14 Battery, 30 Battery, and 32 Battery). Some older reports suggested that each battery was to be equipped with one SAMOC, one GAMB, and four to six iLaunchers but later reports instead suggest that batteries are divided into two fire-groups each with a SAMOC, GAMB and three launchers. However, it is currently unclear if all four batteries are fully equipped, with some suggesting the UK may have only had twelve launchers prior to the new contract, or four fire-groups worth (or two batteries) with the new announcement adding a further two fire-groups of launchers (one battery). Some even theorised that this contract may have actually been referring to an order for iLaunchers to outfit six brand new fire-groups as opposed to six individual launchers.

=== Poland ===
The Polish Armed Forces had begun modernisation efforts for its air-defence capability in the 2010s with the development of its domestic Pilica system for short-range air defence, and the procurement of Patriot (known as Wisła in Polish service) with PAC-3 MSE missiles for medium-range capabilities from 2017. The gap between these two systems would be filled by the new Narew system which would make up the bulk of Polish air defence assets.

The CAMM family was selected to equip Narew in November 2021 with the intention being to equip the system with CAMM-ER. An urgent operational requirement and interim solution known as Mała Narew (small/little Narew) was created in 2022 and would be equipped with the already in-production CAMM variant whilst also marking the beginning of both a technology transfer from MBDA to PGZ and the development of a CAMM training program. Mała Narew saw iLaunchers equipped with CAMM mounted onto Polish Jelcz vehicles, guided by SOŁA radar stations and integrated with a Polish command system. On 4 October 2022, the first fully operational unit of Mała Narew was handed over to the soldiers of the 18th Anti-Aircraft Regiment in Zamość. Mała Narew saw the first live-firing of CAMM in June 2023.

In April 2023, Poland signed a £1.9 billion contract with MBDA to manufacture of a total of 22 Pilica+ air defence batteries, which at the time was the largest European short-range air defence acquisition programme in NATO. Pilica+ would see the existing SHORAD missile and gunnery components of Pilica combined with a similar launcher arrangement as Mała Narew with CAMM to expand Pilica into a triple-layer system. The contract includes 44 launchers and 750 missiles, to be delivered from 2025 to 2029. MBDA's press release also confirmed that the CAMM family would equip the Polish Navy's Wicher-class frigates, although there was at the time no mention as to which missile variant(s) (CAMM / CAMM-ER) would be integrated.

In July 2023, the UK and Poland with MBDA and PGZ signed agreements that formally began the joint development of the CAMM-MR which would be known as the "Joint/Future Common Missile" with the intention that it would be used by both British and Polish platforms such as on the Wicher-class frigates and possibly Wisła batteries.

In November 2023, a more than £4 billion ($4.9 billion) contract was signed between MBDA and PGZ for the procurement of over 1,000 CAMM-ER missiles and over 100 iLaunchers to equip the forthcoming Narew batteries, in addition to further technology transfers agreements enabling licensed production of both the missiles and launchers within Poland. It also confirmed that Narew would be integrated with the US's Integrated Battle Command System (IBCS) as was already the case with Wisła. This is the biggest export contract for MBDA as well as between Poland and the UK.

On 14 December 2023, the PGZ-PILICA+ consortium signed a $139 million contract for the provision 44 iLaunchers and their parent Jelcz vehicles that will equip the 22 Pilica+ batteries (two launchers per battery).

On 20 December 2023, Poland signed a $782.5 million deal with the PGZ-NAREW consortium for 24 mobile P-18PL long-range radars for use within both Narew and Wisła with the delivery of all systems expected to be complete by 2035.

In late December 2023, while reporting on developments with the Wicher-class frigates, Naval News confirmed that both CAMM and CAMM-ER would equip the three ship class.

On 29 February 2024, The Polish Armaments Agency announced a $2.53 billion agreement for the delivery and formal integration of IBCS into both the Narew and Wisła systems.

On 21 January 2025, the UK and Poland announced the creation of a joint programme office in Bristol expected to open in later in the 2025 to support the delivery of Narew to Poland. The establishment of the office forms part of a wider defence and security agreement between the two countries that was announced on 16 January 2025.

On 2 September 2025, MBDA announced the first deliveries of CAMM missiles and iLaunchers from MBDA's Bolton site for use in Pilica+. They will undergo camouflage painting and vehicle integration in Poland before linking together with the Zenit command and control system and Bystra Radar to form the first firing units of the system and begin an intensive training programme in readiness for operational deployment.

== Gallery ==
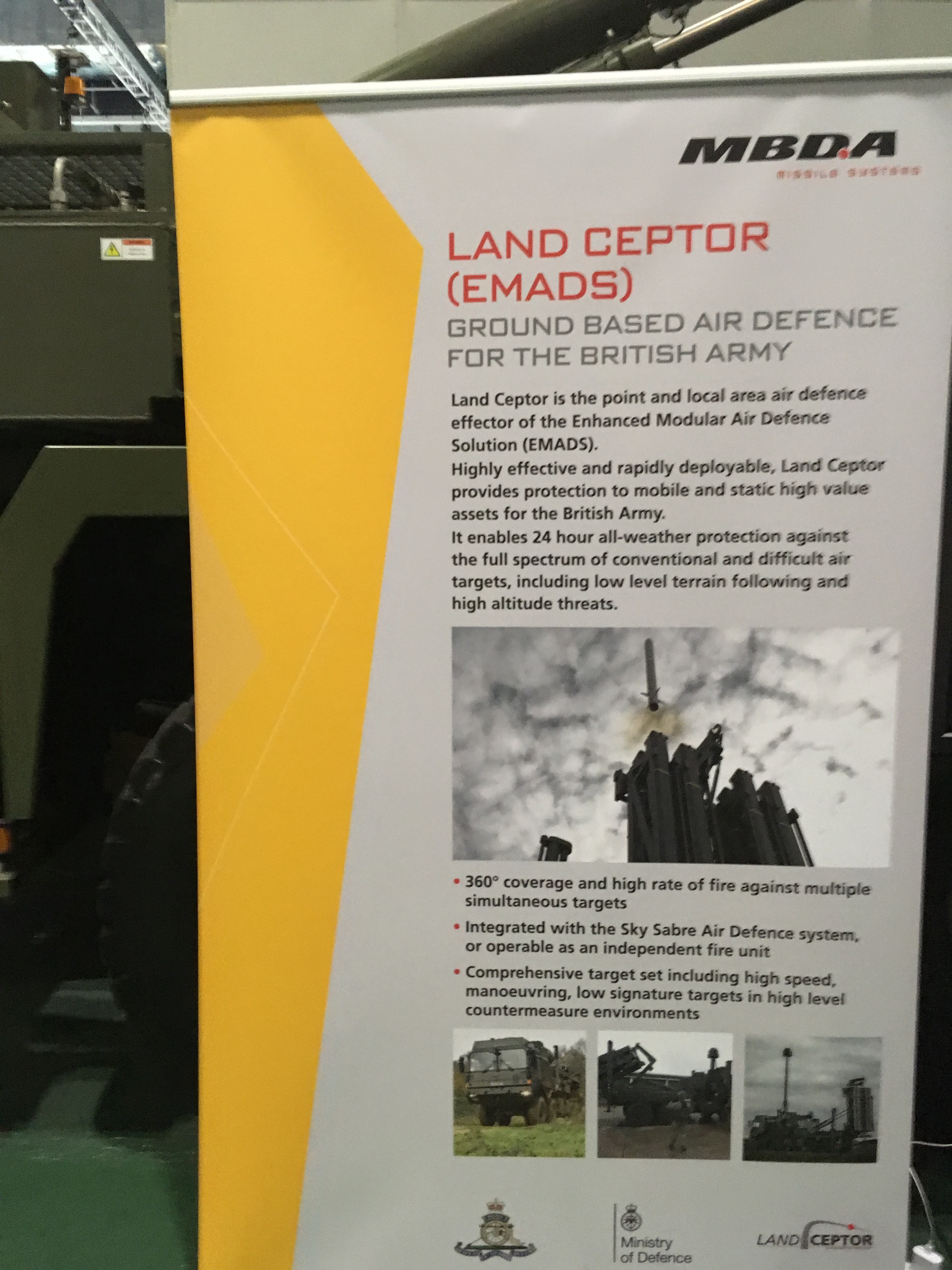

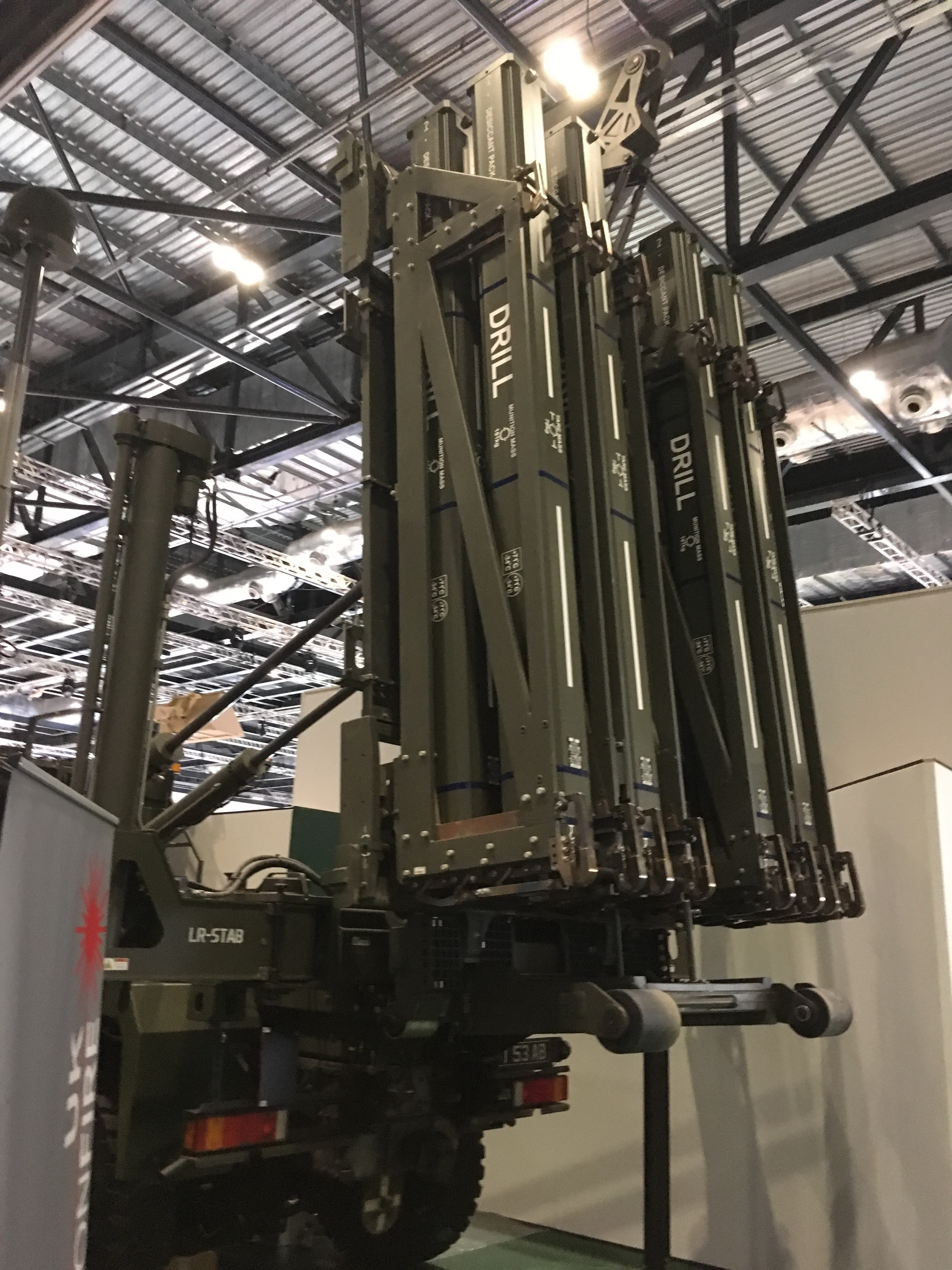
MBDA's iLauncher -mountable/dismountable launching system

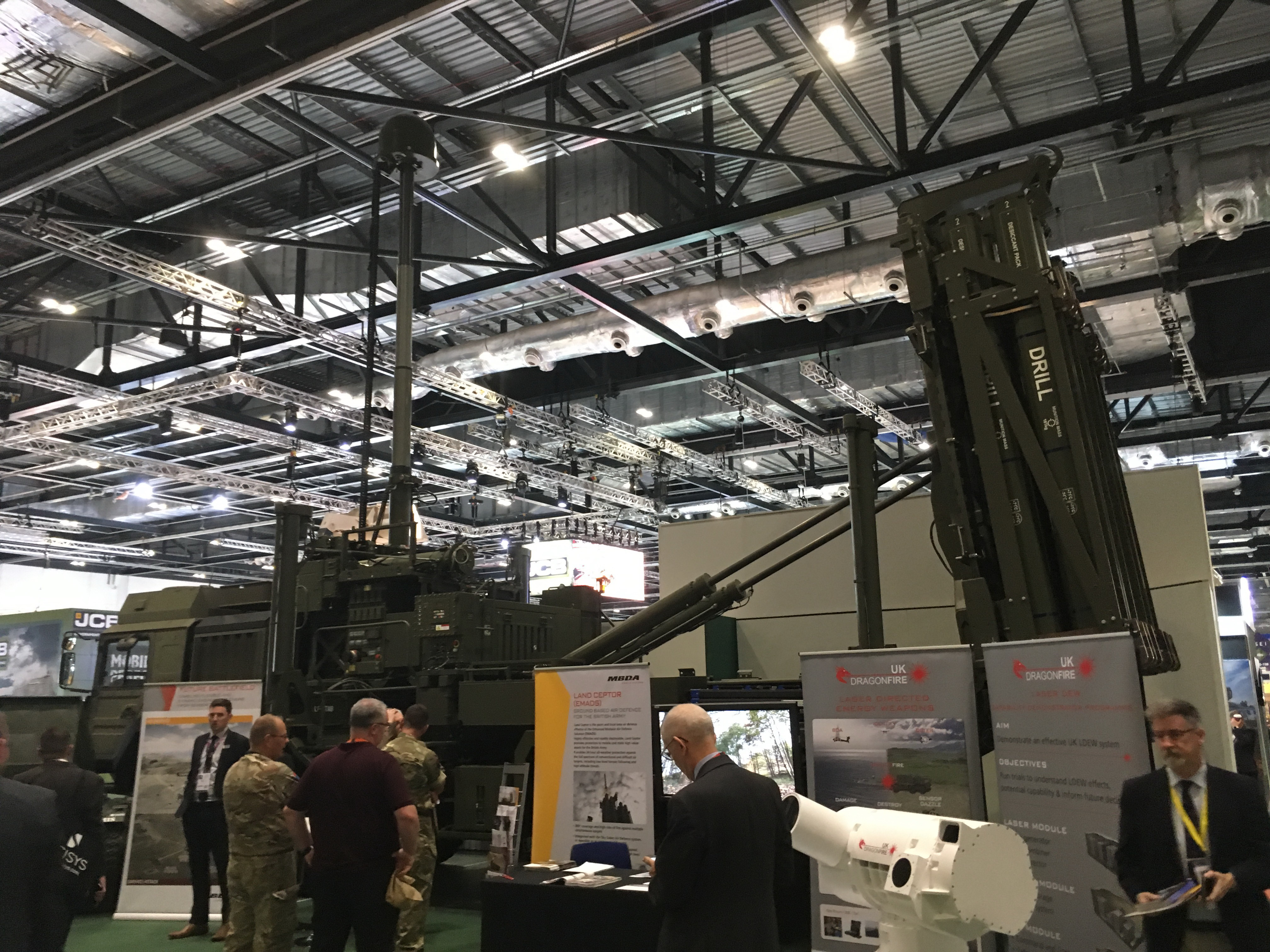

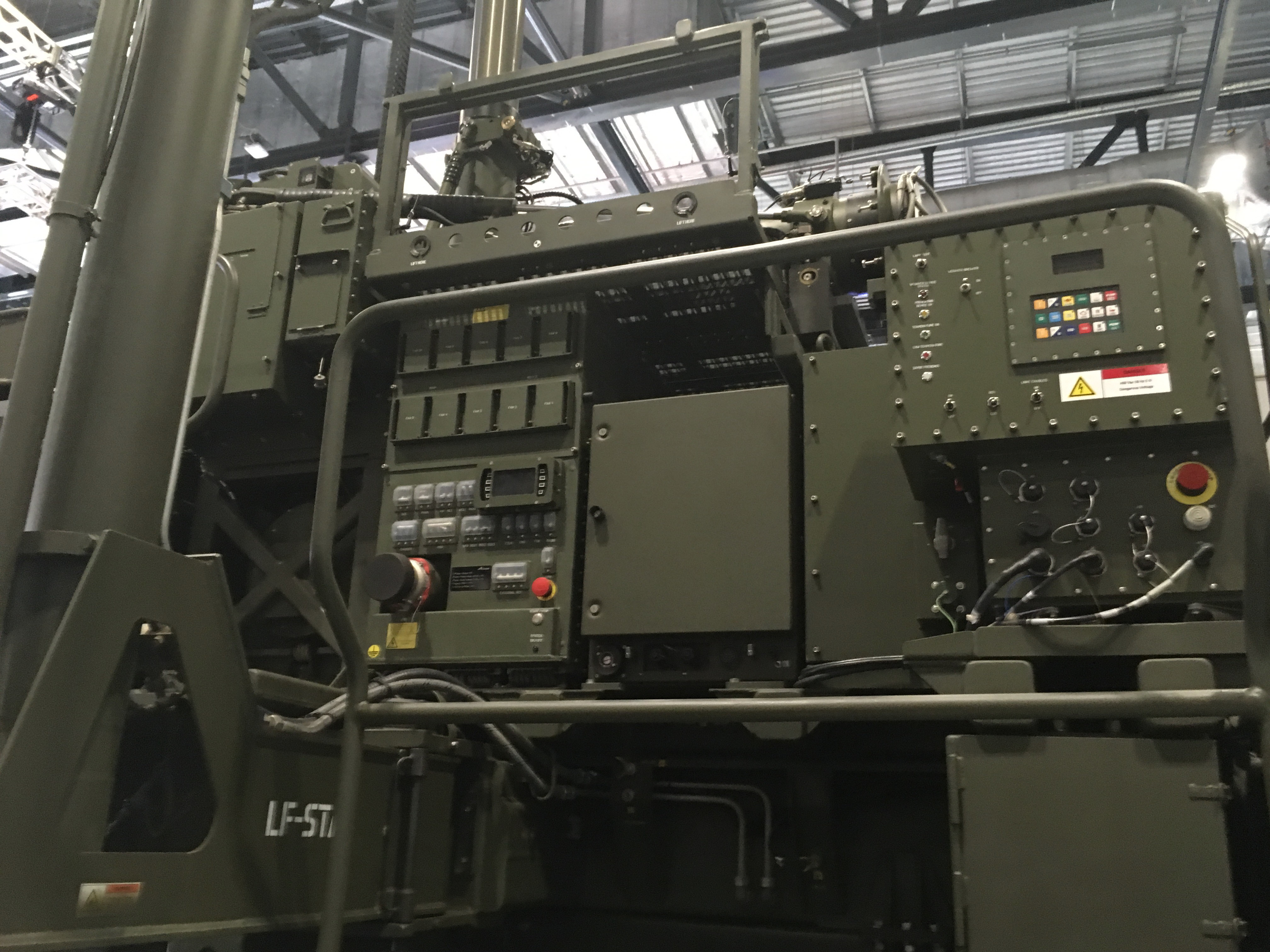

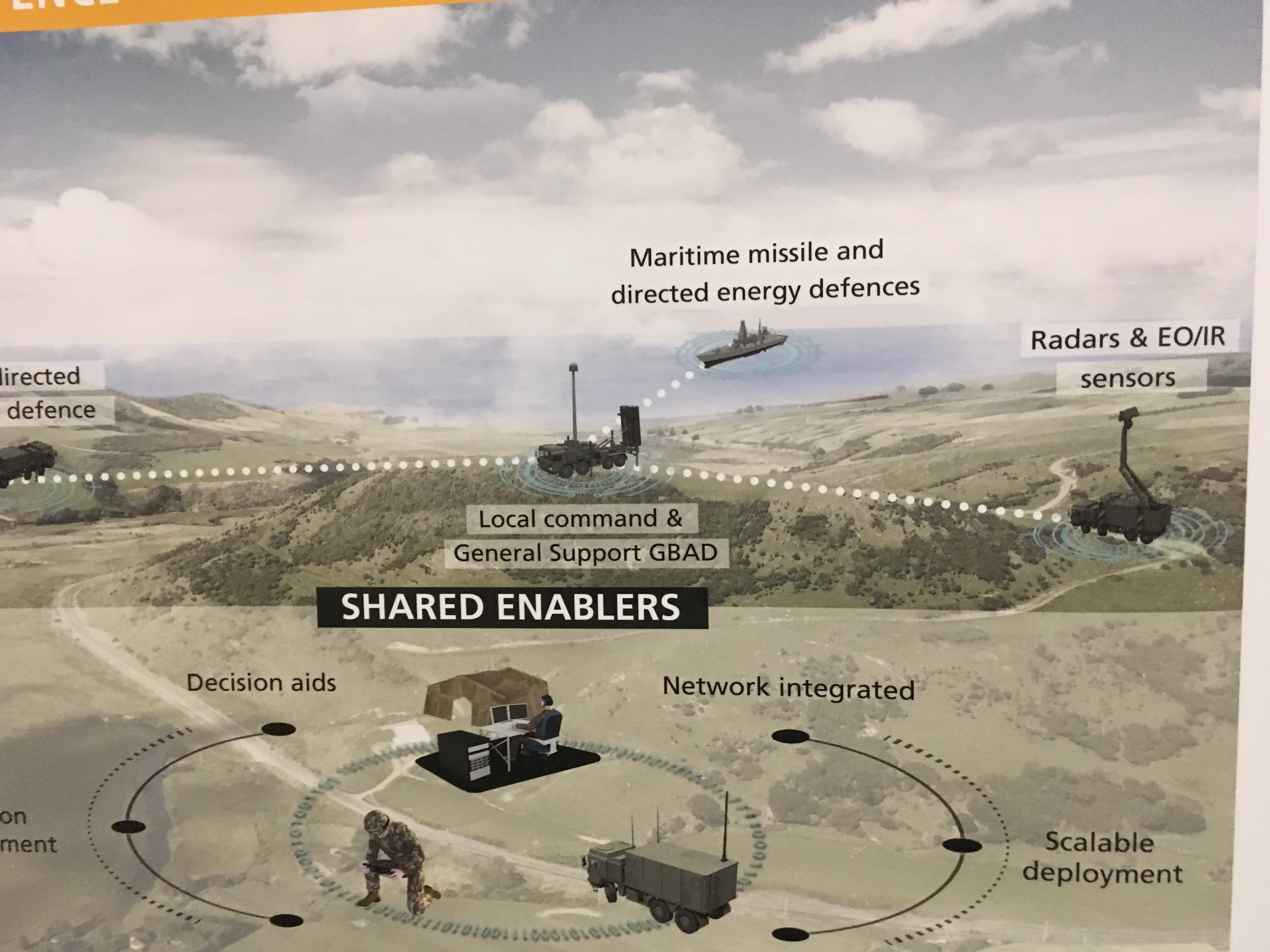

== Operators ==
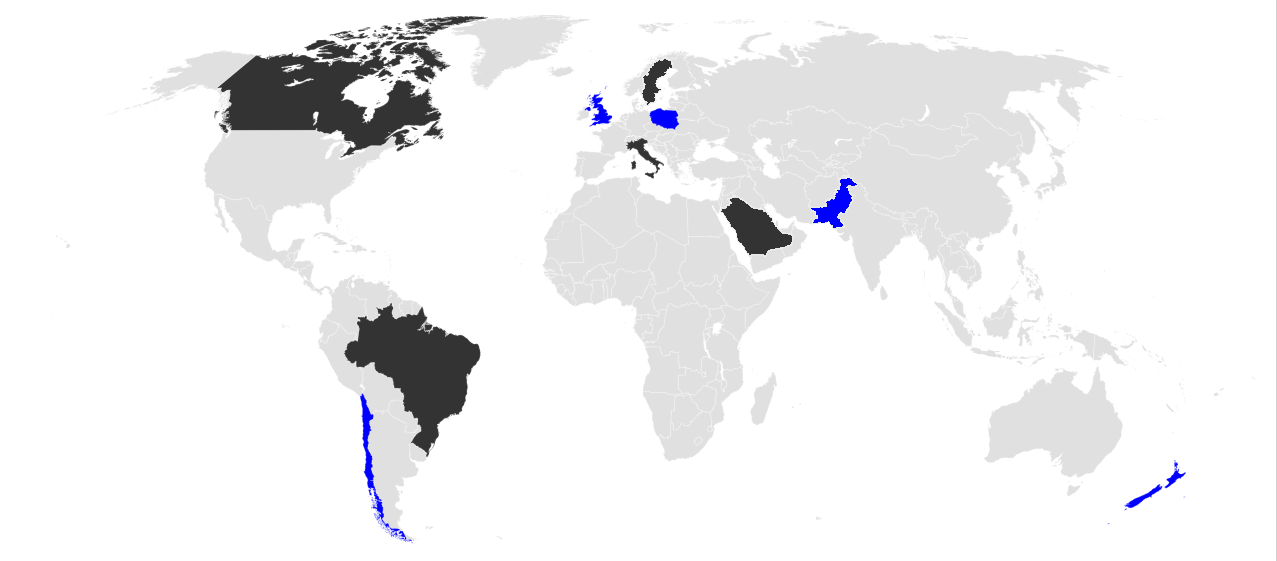
Operators Current Future

=== Current operators ===
==== Ground-based air defence (Land Ceptor) ====
Poland

- Polish Armed Forces – The CAMM family was selected as the effector of Poland's domestic Narew short-range air defence system in November 2021. In April 2022, due to the deterioration of security caused by the Russian invasion of Ukraine and the crisis on the border with Belarus, Poland purchased a small number of CAMMs for two air defence batteries as an interim solution known as Mała Narew (Little Narew). In April 2023, it was announced that CAMM would be integrated into the existing PSR-A Pilica very short-range system to create the triple-layer Pilica+ (22 batteries with two launchers each). In November 2023, the Polish PGZ signed an agreement with the British MBDA to launch the production of CAMM-ER missiles in Poland with an order for over 1,000 missiles.

United Kingdom

- British Army – The Sky Sabre air defence system armed with CAMM began entering service with the Royal Artillery in January 2022 replacing Rapier.

==== Naval-based air defence (Sea Ceptor) ====
Brazil

- Brazilian Navy – in 2014, Sea Ceptor was selected to equip the new Tamandaré-class frigates using a 12-cell mushroom farm.

Chile

- Chilean Navy – in 2014, Sea Ceptor was selected to replace Sea Wolf on the Type 23 frigates (32-missiles). As of 2022, all three Frigates had been successfully upgraded with Sea Ceptor.

New Zealand

- Royal New Zealand Navy – In 2013, Sea Ceptor was selected to replace the RIM-7 Sea Sparrow as part of a Anzac-class frigate system upgrade for HMNZS Te Kaha and HMNZS Te Mana. The eight-cell Mark 41 launcher has been replaced by a 20-cell mushroom farm (20 missiles). The first live firing of Sea Ceptor occurred during HMNZS Te Mana's deployment between July and December 2023.

Pakistan

- Pakistan Navy – Latest naval variant Albatros NG system (CAMM-ER) was selected to equip its new Babur-class corvette in March 2021, although this was not officially disclosed until April. Two 6-cell mushroom farm modules (12 missiles) are located just aft of the main gun.

United Kingdom

- Royal Navy – Sea Ceptor was officially declared "in service" with the Royal Navy in May 2018, replacing Sea Wolf on the Type 23 frigate (32-missiles). Sea Ceptor will also equip the Type 26 (48 missiles) and Type 31 frigates (at least 12 missiles), and is to be integrated in 24 new silos on the Type 45 destroyers, replacing Aster 15 on the destroyers in the process.

=== Future operators ===
==== Ground-based air defence (Land Ceptor) ====
Brazil

- Brazilian Army – On 10 January 2026, the Brazilian Army officially formalized a directive for the acquisition of the EMADS (Enhanced Modular Air Defence Solutions), also known as Land Ceptor, as its new medium-range surface-to-air missile system. The directive establishes the system as part of the Army's modernization program for air defence, aiming to strengthen protection of strategic regions and critical infrastructure. The acquisition process will be conducted in phases, with contract negotiations expected to advance during 2026. The EMADS will integrate into the Army's anti-aircraft artillery units, providing coverage against aircraft, drones and cruise missiles, and is considered a key step in aligning Brazil with NATO-standard air defence technologies, and that the future system will be deployed in one group equipped with two batteries, stationed in Jundiaí, near São Paulo.
- Brazilian Marine Corps – AV-MMA is a Brazilian localised version of the CAMM originally envisaged to equip all three service branches via a common canister container, will equip the anti-aircraft version of the Astros II MLRS.

Italy

- Italian Army – CAMM-ER along with PCMI/X-TAR radar selected as Grifo (Griffin) to replace the Skyguard (Aspide).
- Italian Air Force – CAMM-ER along with Kronos radar selected as MAADS (Medium Advanced Air Defence System) to replace the SPADA (Aspide missiles) batteries.

==== Naval-based air defence (Sea Ceptor) ====
Italy

- Italian Navy – Albatross-NG (CAMM-ER) selected to replace the Aspide (Albatross) missiles.

Poland

- Polish Navy – The Projekt 106 (Wicher-class) frigates will be armed with CAMM and CAMM-ER missiles quad-packed into their 32-cell Mark 41 complex, with CAMM-MR expected to follow in the future.

Saudi Arabia

- Royal Saudi Navy – in February 2023, CAMM was selected to equip the Aegis Combat System on the Multi-Mission Surface Combatant (MMSC) over the RIM-162 ESSM. 32 missiles will be quad-packed into the 8-cell Mark 41 complex. Janes reported that alongside the development of an in-country missile maintenance centre, Saudi Arabia was also looking at plans to locally produce both CAMM and CAMM-ER missiles.

Sweden

- Swedish Navy – On 16 November 2023, the Swedish Defence Material Administration (FMV) signed a contract with MBDA to supply Sea Ceptor for the five Visby-class corvettes, with installation beginning in 2025 with the first upgraded vessel expected in 2026. Neither party disclosed contract value or the anticipated configuration of the system, however, the artist impression accompanying MBDA's press release appears to show intentions to fit a 9-cell ExLS complex forward of the flight deck for 36 missiles.

=== Potential operators ===
Egypt

- Egyptian Armed Forces – As of 13 March 2023, Egypt was reportedly in talks with MBDA regarding a purchase of CAMM.

Malaysia

- Malaysian Army / Royal Malaysian Air Force - During the Defence Services Asia (DSA) 2024 exhibition in Kuala Lumpur, MBDA revealed that it was offering both EMADS and MICA-NG to meet a forthcoming Malaysian short-range air-defence requirement.

=== Failed bids ===
Canada

- Royal Canadian Navy – Sea Ceptor was originally selected to equip the River-class destroyer as a Close-In Air Defence System (CIADS) utilising a six-cell ExLS complex with 24 missiles. The RIM-116 Rolling Airframe Missile was later selected to replace the Sea Ceptor in the CIADS role.

Finland

- Finnish Army – MBDA pitched CAMM and CAMM-ER for the ITSUKO ground-based air defence program with a launcher mounted on a Volvo FMX 8x8 truck, and integrated with a Saab Giraffe radar. Rafael and Raytheon's David's Sling system was instead selected in 2023.
- Finnish Navy – MBDA pitched Sea Ceptor for the air defence requirements (ITO20) of the Squadron 2020 Corvette Program, later known as the four Pohjanmaa-class corvettes. MBDA lost to Raytheon's RIM-162 Evolved SeaSparrow Missile (ESSM).

Spain

- Spanish Navy – In May 2016, CAMM-ER was selected to equip the future F110-class frigates. However, in 2018 Raytheon's ESSM Block II was chosen instead.

Switzerland

- Swiss Air Force – On 30 April 2024, Switzerland's Federal Office for Defence Procurement (Armasuisse) requested offers from three manufacturers, including MBDA, for a medium-range air defence system for the Bodluv MR Programme. MBDA was reportedly offering CAMM-ER in competition against Diehl with a variant of the IRIS-T SL and Kongsberg/Raytheon with the NASAMS NG. All offers were to be provided by July 2024, with a decision expected in the third quarter of 2024, and the financing and order to be planned with the armament program by 2025. In July 2024, Kongsberg/Raytheon and MBDA decided not to submit offers, leaving Diehl to win the tender, pending negotiation.

== See also ==
- Anti-aircraft warfare
- List of missiles
- IRIS-T SL – (Germany)
- Hisar – (Turkey)
- Barak 8 – (India, Israel)
- VL MICA – (France)
- Umkhonto – (South Africa)
- VL-SRSAM – (India)
