= SA-35 =

- Type: Self-propelled anti-aircraft gun (35 mm)
- Place of origin: Poland

Production history
- Manufacturer: PIT-RADWAR
- Produced: demonstrator (public presentation 2024)

Specifications
- Mass: 675 kg (1,488 lb) (KDA autocannon)

SA-35 is a 35 mm self-propelled anti-aircraft gun developed by PIT-RADWAR and mounted on a Jelcz 663.45 T60 (6×6) truck chassis, presented as an effector for engaging, among others, unmanned aerial vehicles, helicopters and aircraft; it was first publicly shown at the MSPO 2024 as a demonstrator.

== Design and integration ==
In manufacturer materials, SA-35 was described as a solution combining an artillery effector (the firepower of the AM-35), a programmable ammunition system, and sensors and a fire-control system based on an electro-optical channel (ZGS-35) and a radiolocation channel (TUGA radar), mounted on a mobile 6×6 "3rd generation" Jelcz platform.

=== Armament and ammunition ===
The main armament of SA-35 is the autocannon KDA-35 in 35×228 mm caliber. In publicly available materials concerning PIT-RADWAR 35 mm solutions, the following were indicated, among others:

- KDA gun parameters: theoretical rate of fire 550 rounds/min, muzzle velocity up to 1385 m/s, engagement range against air targets up to 4000 m and against ground targets up to 2500 m;
- ammunition feed: dual-sided, two belt feeds (magazines of 100 rounds each);
- ammunition types (in descriptions of the 35 mm family): including FAPDS-T subcaliber and programmable ABM (Air Burst Munition);
- barrel length: 3150 mm;
- gun weight: 675 kg.

In the XXXII MSPO brochure, it was indicated that the gun is fully stabilized, which is intended to enable firing while driving.

=== Fire control system and sensors ===
The TUGA radar was described as an AESA 4D radar in the X band, intended, among other things, for detecting and tracking small air targets (including unmanned aerial vehicles) and supporting fire.

In publicly available manufacturer materials and descriptions of the OSU-35K/AM-35 family (on which the SA-35 effector is based), the following fire-control elements were indicated:

- TUGA radar – a 4D radar with an AESA antenna, using FMCW technique; intended to detect and track, among others, unmanned aerial vehicles, aircraft and helicopters;
- ZGS-35K electro-optical head – a thermal imaging camera (3–5 μm), daylight camera and a laser rangefinder;
- FCS blocks – the BSKO-35K fire-control system block and the RSKO-35K backup fire-control station (described in the OSU-35K family as system elements);
- stabilization – in the OSU-35K family description, stabilization of the sensors’ line of sight and the gun’s aiming line was indicated, enabling firing while moving (in maritime conditions).

In reports about the SA-35 demonstrator, the possibility of remote control (remote station/terminal) was also described.

=== Carrier (Jelcz 663.45 6×6) ===
In reports from MSPO, the demonstrator carrier was described as an armored Jelcz 663.45 T60 6×6 truck. In an analysis concerning the "3rd generation Jelcz", among others, an MTU OM460 LA (Euro III) engine with 335 kW (approx. 449 hp) and 2000 Nm, a ZF automatic transmission (6 forward gears), an armored 3-person cab, and a vehicle mass of about 18.5 t and a gross vehicle weight (GVW) up to 33 t (depending on configuration) were given.

In the demonstrator description, a turret mass with the gun of about 3500 kg and the mass of the complete platform (turret + fire-control system elements on a container platform) of about 6000 kg were given.

In publicly available descriptions of the 663.45 model, among others, the following were indicated:

- engine: MTU OM460 LA (Euro III), 335 kW at 1800 rpm and 2000 Nm at 1300 rpm;
- mass and GVW: curb weight "a little over 18 t", gross vehicle weight up to 33 t; with a trailer up to 57 t;
- cab: armored (indicated level 1 according to STANAG 4569), three-person; in the 3rd-generation layout the engine was placed behind the cab (the "powerpack" concept);
- transmission: ZF automatic (6 forward gears).

=== Summary of key (publicly disclosed) parameters ===
Area	Parameter	Value (publicly disclosed)	Source
Armament	Caliber / cartridge	35×228 mm	
Armament	Theoretical rate of fire	550 rounds/min	
Armament	Barrel length	3150 mm	
Armament	Muzzle velocity	up to 1385 m/s	
Armament	Engagement range (KDA autocannon)	air targets up to 4000 m; ground targets up to 2500 m	
Ammunition	Ammunition feed	2 belt feeds; magazines of 100 rounds	
FCS / sensors	Radar	TUGA: 4D AESA radar (FMCW)	
FCS / sensors	Electro-optics	ZGS-35K: daylight camera + thermal (3–5 μm) + laser rangefinder	
Carrier	Engine	MTU OM460 LA: 335 kW; 2000 Nm	
Carrier	Mass / GVW	curb weight >18 t; GVW up to 33 t (with trailer up to 57 t)	
Demonstrator	Installed mass (indicative)	turret ~3.5 t; complete platform ~6 t	

== History ==
In trade publications, SA-35 was placed within the line of Polish work on 35 mm artillery systems (the land thread "Noteć" and the parallel naval thread OSU-35/OSU-35K), with solutions derived from the OSU-35K/AM-35 family indicated as the effector.

SA-35 was described as a development of the naval OSU-35K gun, adapted to a mobile role on a wheeled carrier. In the background, earlier work on Polish 35 mm artillery systems for the "Noteć" programme was indicated, including the SAN-35 research model (2007–2008) as a stage of conceptual work on using the KDA gun and solutions from the Loara development line.

In a 2018 Defence24 analysis it was stated that the PIT-RADWAR-developed 35 mm anti-aircraft gun underwent a series of tests in 2017, and one of the next steps was to integrate and verify the use of programmable ammunition; in this context, dual-sided ammunition feeding from two magazines and the role of the "Noteć" programme were also described.

The system was publicly shown, among others, at MSPO 2024 in Kielce. During MSPO 2025, an SA-35 configuration integrated with the TUGA radar was presented.

In a MILMAG report, it was stated that after MSPO 2024 the SA-35 demonstrator was sent to live-fire trials at the Central Air Force Training Range in Ustka, where tests using live ammunition were conducted (including a series of several hundred rounds); it was also indicated that separate, instrumented trials would be needed to confirm firing while moving, and that external target cueing (including using the Bystra radar) and communications/command solutions adapted to the needs of the trials were used.

In February 2026, PIT-RADWAR stated that SA-35 guns are to be used in the fire modules of the Armaments Agency-ordered SAN system.
