= Narew (air defence system) =

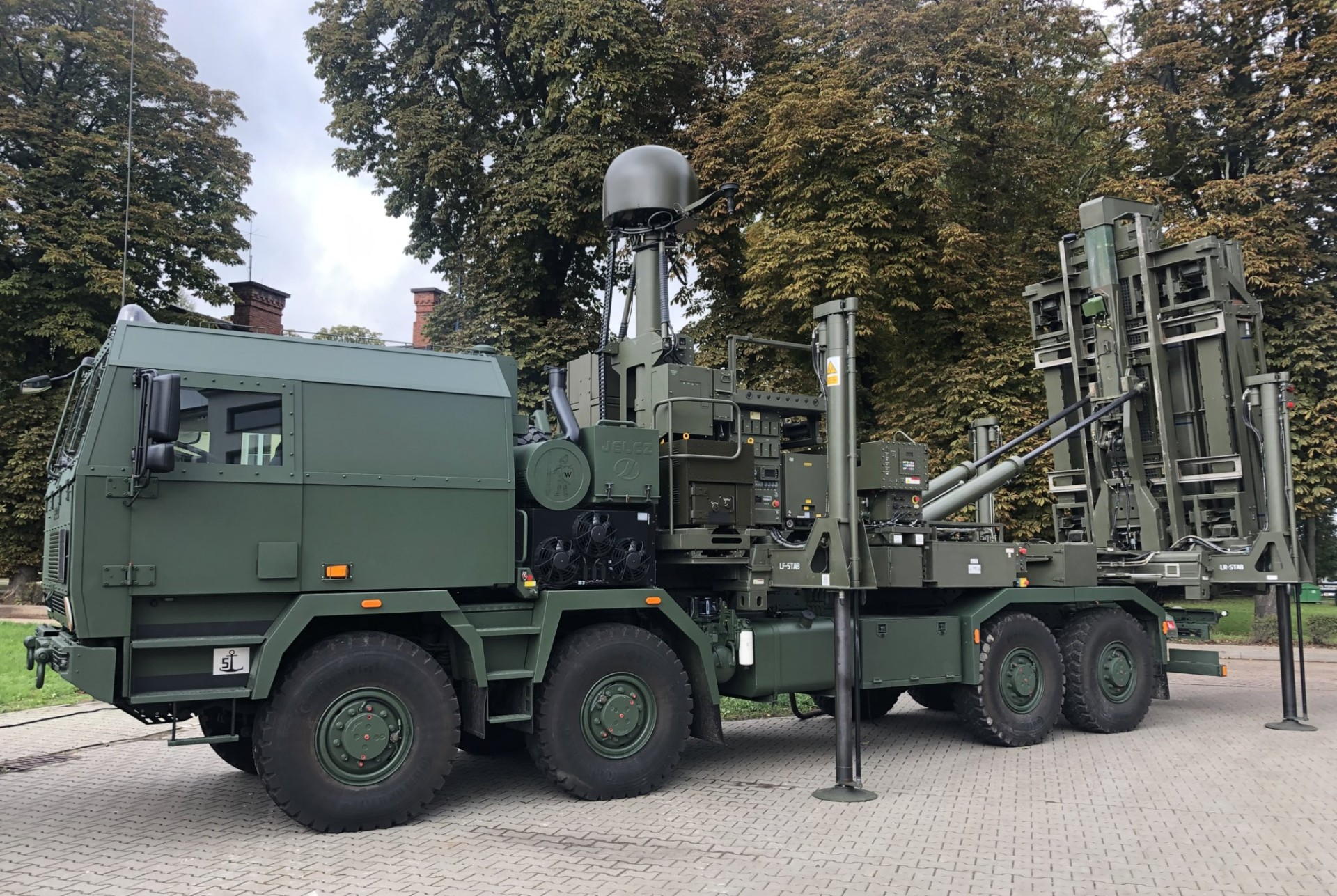
An iLauncher on a Jelcz chassis, part of the Small Narew system

Narew is a Polish armament programme for the procurement of 23 batteries of short-range surface-to-air missile systems. The final system is intended to use CAMM-ER missiles and to be used primarily against crewed airborne threats, cruise missiles and unmanned aerial vehicles operating at low altitude. MBDA, the manufacturer of CAMM-ER, describes the engagement range of the final Narew system as exceeding 40 km.

== Narew armament programme ==
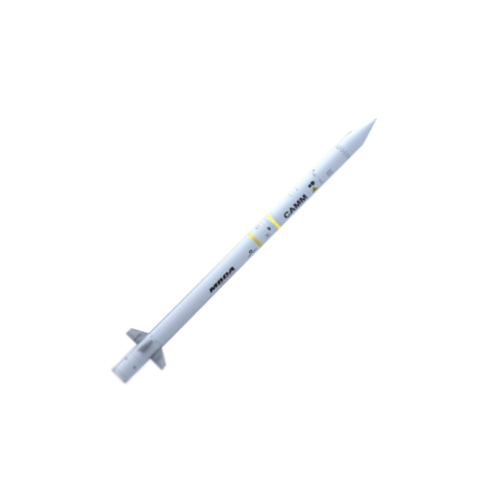
CAMM surface-to-air missile

In September 2013, the Polish government established the multiannual programme Priority Tasks for the Technical Modernisation of the Polish Armed Forces under Operational Programmes. The programme specified tasks and expenditure connected with the technical modernisation of the Polish Armed Forces and the attainment of defined operational capabilities.

One of its components was the Air Defence System Operational Programme, whose purpose was to develop air- and missile-defence capabilities, including protection of troops and important facilities.

On 7 September 2021, the Armament Inspectorate and the PGZ-NAREW consortium signed a framework agreement for implementation of the Narew programme. The framework agreement was subsequently to be implemented through successive executive contracts covering individual elements of the system.

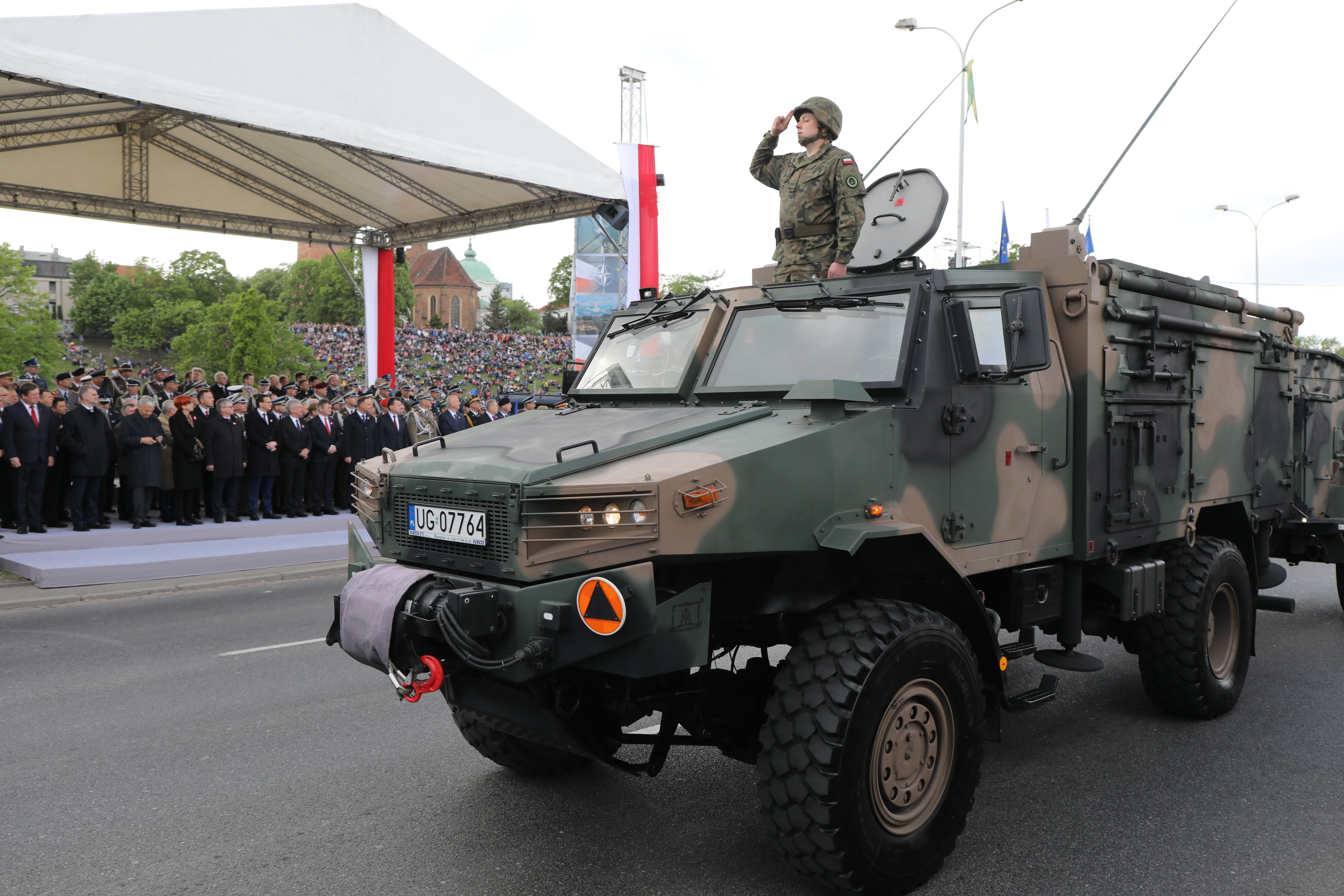
A SOŁA deployable radar station mounted on an armoured Żubr-P vehicle

On 14 April 2022, the Armament Agency signed an executive contract with the PGZ-NAREW consortium for delivery of initial effector-system elements under a project known as Small Narew (Mała Narew). The contract covered two fire units equipped with CAMM missiles and iLauncher launchers integrated with Polish components. Each fire unit included a SOŁA radar, a Polish-made weapon-control device, transport-loader vehicles, three iLauncher launchers and CAMM missiles. The SOŁA radars were intended as an interim solution, to be replaced in the final system by SAJNA radars.

On 5 September 2023, the Armament Agency signed two principal executive contracts with the PGZ-NAREW consortium for the final system. The first, worth approximately PLN 24.8 billion gross, covered more than 1,000 CAMM-ER missiles, while the second, worth approximately PLN 29.2 billion gross, covered 138 iLauncher launchers adapted for CAMM-ER and integration with the IBCS. The combined value of the contracts was approximately PLN 54 billion gross, with deliveries scheduled for 2027–2035. The contracts also included technology transfer intended to enable production of missiles and launchers in Poland.

On 7 November 2023, Polska Grupa Zbrojeniowa (PGZ) and MBDA signed an agreement covering MBDA support for implementation of the programme by PGZ and the transfer of key technologies and expertise. According to MBDA, the agreement was intended to enable the PGZ-NAREW consortium to manufacture more than 1,000 CAMM-ER missiles and more than 100 launchers in Poland.

== System components ==
The final Narew system is intended to have a network-centric architecture in which sensors, command assets and effectors are integrated through IBCS. Planned components include specialist vehicles, operational and combat-command cabins, mobile communications nodes, electro-optical sensors, missiles and launchers, transport-loader vehicles, training and logistics packages, and SAJNA, P-18PL and PET/PCL radars.

Component	Number	Notes
Narew batteries	23	Planned number of batteries covered by the executive contracts.
Fire units	46	Two fire units per battery.
iLauncher launchers	138	Three launchers per fire unit; each launcher is intended to carry eight CAMM-ER missile canisters.
CAMM-ER missiles	more than 1,000	Deliveries scheduled for 2027–2035.
P-18PL early-warning radars	24	Deliveries, including logistics and training packages, scheduled for 2027–2035.
PET/PCL passive-location radars	28 + 18 optional	Up to 46 radars in total; deliveries scheduled for 2030–2038.
SAJNA multifunction fire-control radar	Not disclosed	Intended to be one of the radar types used by the final system.
STZ transport-loader vehicles	36	Contracted on 30 May 2026.
Special-purpose chassis	121	Contracted on 30 May 2026.
MCC mobile communications nodes	16	Contracted on 30 May 2026.
KD WOPL/IBCS command cabins	14	Contracted on 30 May 2026.

The P-18PL is an early-warning radar intended to determine the position of targets at maximum ranges of several hundred kilometres. Although procured under the Narew programme, the radars are intended to provide data to IBCS and support the wider integrated air- and missile-defence system, including both the Narew and Wisła layers. A single P-18PL system consists of a WA-18 antenna vehicle, a WW-18 display vehicle and a JZ-18 power-supply unit.

SAJNA is intended to serve as the multifunction fire-control radar, while PET/PCL is a passive-location system. PET/PCL combines a PET subsystem using electromagnetic emissions generated by equipment aboard airborne objects with a PCL subsystem using signals from external transmitters scattered by detected objects, together with a data-fusion module. PCL signal sources can include FM radio, DVB-T and GSM transmitters.

The planned final number of SAJNA radars and electro-optical sensors for the Narew system has not been publicly disclosed.

== Programme implementation ==
=== Small Narew ===
An interim version of the system, known as Small Narew, was introduced under the programme. The executive contract signed on 14 April 2022 covered two fire units.

Each fire unit consisted of a SOŁA radar, a ZENIT weapon-control unit, three iLauncher launchers mounted on Jelcz chassis, two transport-loader vehicles on chassis from the same manufacturer, and a corresponding number of CAMM missiles. The contract also included training and logistics packages and contractor support for operation of the equipment. In total, the two fire units received six iLauncher launchers and four transport-loader vehicles.

The first user of Small Narew was the 18th Anti-Aircraft Regiment in Zamość. The second system was assigned to a battalion in Elbląg belonging to the 15th Gołdap Anti-Aircraft Regiment. In September 2023, the Ministry of National Defence announced that a Small Narew system had been handed over to the 15th Gołdap Anti-Aircraft Regiment.

=== Final Narew system ===
The executive contracts of 5 September 2023 cover more than 1,000 CAMM-ER missiles and 138 iLauncher launchers for 23 batteries, corresponding to 46 fire units. Each fire unit is to include three launchers, with each launcher carrying eight CAMM-ER missile canisters.

On 19 December 2023, the Armament Agency signed a contract with the PGZ-NAREW consortium for 24 P-18PL early-warning radars together with logistics and training packages. The order was worth more than PLN 3.1 billion gross. Contract implementation was scheduled for 2027–2035, with deliveries of the first radars to begin no later than 2027.

On 29 February 2024, a contract was signed for acquisition of the IBCS integrated air- and missile-defence command system for the second phase of the Wisła programme and for the Narew programme. The order was worth approximately US$2.53 billion net and was scheduled for implementation between 2024 and 2031. The contract covers command and communications equipment required for six Wisła batteries and 23 Narew systems, integration of the radars of both systems with IBCS, integration of Narew launchers and interoperability testing of components of both systems.

On 6 November 2024, the start of implementation of the principal executive contracts for CAMM-ER missiles and iLauncher launchers was announced. The schedules of the contracts continued to provide for delivery of these elements to the Polish Armed Forces between 2027 and 2035.

On 2 September 2025, during the International Defence Industry Exhibition, a contract was signed for PET/PCL passive-location radars. The guaranteed order covers 28 radars worth approximately PLN 3.9 billion gross, with an option for a further 18 radars worth approximately PLN 1.9 billion gross. Deliveries are scheduled for 2030–2038. The Ministry of National Defence stated that the radars can be used by both the Narew and Wisła systems.

On 30 May 2026, the Armament Agency signed six further contracts with the PGZ-NAREW consortium covering components of the final system. These included STZ transport-loader vehicles, special-purpose chassis, camouflage and deception equipment, MCC mobile communications nodes, KD WOPL/IBCS command cabins and a logistics package. Deliveries are to be completed by 2035, and the contracts are co-financed through the European Union's SAFE instrument. The orders covered 36 transport-loader vehicles, 121 special-purpose chassis, 16 MCC mobile communications nodes and 14 command cabins.

According to the schedules of the signed contracts, major deliveries of the final Narew configuration are due to begin in 2027. Deliveries of more than 1,000 CAMM-ER missiles, 138 iLauncher launchers and 24 P-18PL radars are scheduled for 2027–2035. PET/PCL radar deliveries are scheduled for 2030–2038, while delivery of the components covered by the contracts of 30 May 2026 is to be completed by 2035.

=== Development of the industrial base ===
On 25 June 2024, the Polish Council of Ministers adopted a resolution providing for capital injections of approximately PLN 3.888 billion into companies belonging to the PGZ-NAREW consortium between 2024 and 2030. Funding from the Capital Investment Fund was divided into seven stages and allocated to expansion of infrastructure and the production, servicing, and research and development capabilities of companies participating in the programme.

On 20 October 2025, investment agreements worth a total of PLN 3 billion from the Capital Investment Fund were signed for four PGZ companies participating in the Narew programme: Jelcz, PIT-Radwar, Wojskowe Zakłady Uzbrojenia and Zakłady Mechaniczne Tarnów. The funding was allocated, among other purposes, to construction of a new Jelcz plant, expansion of PIT-RADWAR capabilities, establishment of infrastructure for production of air-defence system components at Wojskowe Zakłady Uzbrojenia, and expansion of the production, servicing and research-and-development capabilities of Zakłady Mechaniczne Tarnów.

On 1 April 2026, an investment agreement was signed at MESKO for establishment of production capacity for rocket motors and warheads for CAMM-ER missiles. According to the Ministry of National Defence, the investment, together with development of capabilities at other plants, is intended to enable assembly of complete missiles in Poland.

On 15 April 2026, OBR CTM and PGZ signed an investment agreement for construction of a Weapon and Systems Integration Centre in Gdynia. The centre is to be associated with implementation of the Narew programme and used for integration, testing and validation of weapon systems.

== See also ==
- Pilica
- European Sky Shield Initiative
