= Kazimierz Dyński =

Polish Armed Forces officer

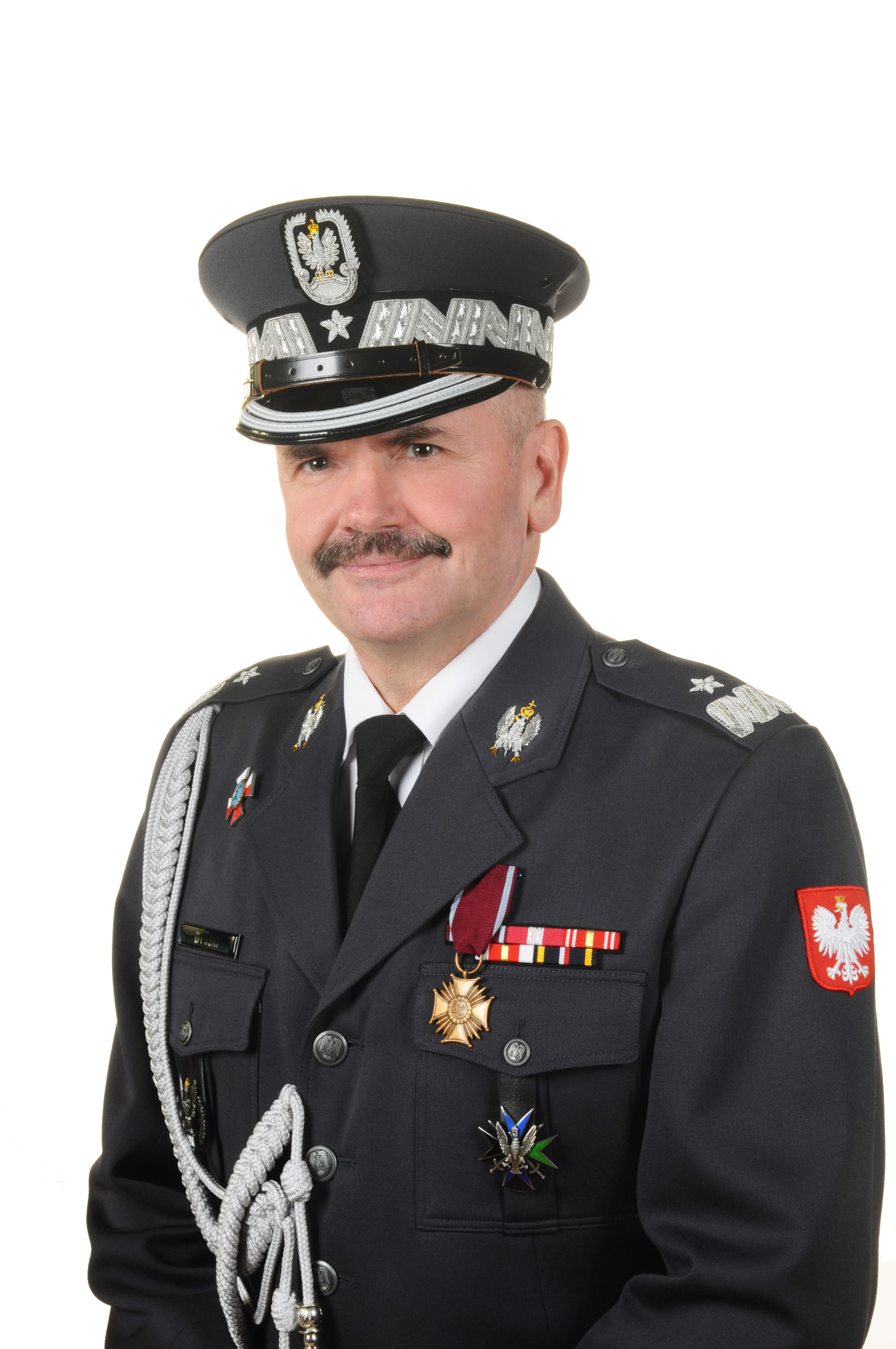
- Born: 27 September 1964 (age 62); Chełm
- Military career
- Allegiance: Poland
- Branch: Polish Armed Forces
- Service years: 41
- Rank: Brigadier General
- Units: Siły Zbrojne PRL; Siły Zbrojne RP
- Commands: • platoon commander, 38 SAM Sqn • battery commander, 38 SAM Sqn • specialist of the Operational and Tactical Training Department, Air and Air Defence HQ • Chief of the Exercise Planning Branch, Air and Air Defence HQ • Chief of the Operations Branch, Polish Air Forces HQ • Deputy Chief of the Operations Division, Polish Air Force HQ • Chief of the Operations A3, Air Force HQ • Chief of the Training Division A7, CC AIR HQ • Deputy Chief of the Training Department J7, General Staff • Chief of the Operations Division - Deputy Chief of Staff, General Command of the Polish Armed Forces • commander of the 3rd Air Defence Brigade • Chief of the Air and Missile Defense Department - Deputy Combat Service Support Inspector
- Awards

Narew (air defence system) Kazimierz Dyński (born 27 September 1964 in Chełm) is a Brigadier General in the Polish Armed Forces. Since 2021, he has been the Chief of the Air and Missile Defense Department - Deputy Combat Service Support Inspector, General Command of the Armed Forces.

== Education ==
Graduate of the Secondary Aviation School in Zielona Góra (1983). In 1987 he graduated from Officers' School of Radar Engineering in Jelenia Góra. He is a graduate of the National Defence Academy (1996), post-graduate studies in WSH in Pułtusk (1999), Air War College in Maxwell – USA (2004) and other NATO operational and strategic level courses.

== Career ==
After graduating from officer school, he was assigned to the 26th Air Defense Missile Brigade and began his professional service in the 38th Air Defense Missile Squadron in Stargard Szczeciński. From 1996, after graduating from the National Defense University, he served in the Air Force and Air Defense Command in Warsaw as a specialist and senior specialist of the Operational and Tactical Training Department. In 1999, he took the position of the head of the Operations Branch, and then, from 2004, assumed position as a deputy head of the Air Operations Division A3.

In the years 2006-2009, he performed the duties of the head of the Training Division - Allied Air Component Command in Ramstein (Germany). In the years 2009-2011, he was a national representative on the Board of Directors of NAPMO - an organization that manages of E-3A aircraft of the AWACS system. In 2011, he was appointed as a deputy chief of the Training Department of the General Staff of the Polish Armed Forces. Head of the Project Group in the Transformation Team for the New Command and Control System of the Polish Armed Forces (2013). From August 2013, he was assigned to the Organizational Group of the General Command of the Armed Forces, and then from January 1, 2014, he was appointed to the position of the Chief of the Operational Directorate - Deputy Chief of Staff of the General Command of the Armed Forces.

For his special achievements in the building of the country's defense system, he was awarded an entry in the Book of Honor of the Polish Army In the years 2015 - 2016, by the decision of the Ministry of National Defense, he was appointed the Chairman of the Military Committee for Standardization. From December 2016 to August 2018, by the decision of the Minister of National Defense, A. Macierewicz, he was transferred to the personnel reserve. Director of the Radom Air Show 2017 and 2018 editions. From July 1, 2020, appointed Commander of the 3rd Warsaw Air Defense Brigade.

By order of the President of the Republic of Poland Andrzej Duda of August 7, 2020, he was appointed to the rank of Brigadier general. He received the act of appointment on August 14, 2020, from the President of the Republic of Poland in the Presidential Palace.

Since November 2021 Chief of the Air and Missile Defense Department - Deputy Combat Service Support Inspector, General Command of the Armed Forces. Responsible for the setup and implementation of the Integrated Air and Missile Defence System in Poland. (i.e. Wisła, Narew, Pilica Programs)

Speaker at multiple national and international conferences for example: Warsaw Security Forum, Defence24, Air Defence Development on the eastern flank, Full Spectrum Air Defence London 2023.

== Promotions ==
- Second Lieutenant – 1987
- First Lieutenant – 1990
- Captain – 1994
- Major – 1998
- Lieutenant Colonel – 2000
- Colonel – 2003
- Brigadier general – 14 August 2020

== Awards and decorations ==
- Bronze Cross of Merit – 2000
- Air Cross of Merit - 2021
- Silver Medal for Long Service - 2013
- Gold Medal "The Armed Forces in the Service of the Fatherland" - 2014
- Silver Medal "The Armed Forces in the Service of the Fatherland" - 2003
- Gold Medal "For merits for the defense of the country" - 2014
- Silver Medal "For merits for the defense of the country" - 2009
- Bronze Medal "For merits for the defense of the country" - 2005
- Cross of the 30th anniversary of the Military Ordinariate - 2021
- Medal „W służbie Bogu i Ojczyźnie”Medal "In the service of God and Homeland" - 2019
- Distinguished Soldier of the Republic of Poland, 2nd degree - 2013
- Gold Medal for Merits for the Fire Service - 2021
- Commemorative medal of the 100th anniversary of the Polish Army Garrison Leszno - 2021
- Air Force Badge of Honor - 2015
- Commemorative badge of the General Staff of the Polish Army (No. A-1010) - 2012
- Commemorative badge of the General Command of the Polish Armed Forces (No. 017) - 2014
- Commemorative badge of the 3rd SAM Brigade - 2020
- Commemorative badge of the 32nd SAM Sqn - 2021
- Commemorative badge of the 33rd SAM Sqn - 2020
- Commemorative badge of the 34th SAM Sqn - 2020
- Godfather of the 36th SAM Sqn Banner
