= PIT-Radwar =

Polish defence electronics company

PIT-RADWAR S.A.
- Native name: PIT-RADWAR Spółka Akcyjna
- Type: Subsidiary
- Industry: Defence electronics
- Founded: 30 December 2011 (as PIT-RADWAR; merger); Roots to 1934 (State Telecommunications Institute established by regulation)
- Headquarters: Warsaw, Poland
- Key people: Marek Borejko (CEO)
- Parent: Polska Grupa Zbrojeniowa (PGZ)
- Website: en.pitradwar.com

PIT-RADWAR S.A. is a Polish defence electronics company headquartered in Warsaw. It conducts research, development and production in radar technology, electronic support measures (ESM/ELINT), command-and-control (C2/C4ISR) and related air-defence systems, including sensors and fire-control/effectors.

== History ==
- The company traces its roots to the State Telecommunications Institute established in 1934 by regulation.
- In April 2010, the Bumar Group created an electronics division integrating Przemysłowy Instytut Telekomunikacji (PIT), CNPEP RADWAR and DOLAM.
- PIT-RADWAR S.A. was formed on 30 December 2011 by merging PIT, RADWAR and DOLAM; it operated under the PIT name until February 2012 and was renamed Bumar Elektronika S.A. on 5 March 2012.
- On 30 June 2014 the company changed its name to PIT-RADWAR S.A. by court decision.
- Since 2014, PIT-RADWAR has been part of the Polish Armaments Group (PGZ).

== Business areas ==
PIT-RADWAR’s core activities include:

- air- and surface-surveillance radar systems (mobile and redeployable 3D radars; counter-battery radars; maritime/coastal radars);
- identification friend-or-foe (IFF/SSR) systems and interrogators (Mark XIIA family);
- passive surveillance and electronic intelligence (passive location; ELINT/ESM);
- command-and-control and fire-control systems (C2/C4ISR for air defence and land forces);
- air-defence fire means (guns/CIWS components and SHORAD/VSHORAD effectors).

== Products ==
PIT-RADWAR's product portfolio comprises radar and electronic reconnaissance systems, command-and-control and fire-control systems, and air-defence effectors.

=== Radar and reconnaissance systems ===
| Image | Product | Description |
|---|---|---|
| | P-18PL | A mobile three-dimensional long-range early-warning radar designed for airspace surveillance and target designation for air defence and missile defence systems. It uses an active electronically scanned array (AESA) and electronic scanning in two planes and is designed to detect and track conventional aircraft as well as low-observable targets. |
| — | WARTA | A mobile three-dimensional long-range air-surveillance radar operating in the L band. It uses an AESA antenna and has an instrumented range of 470 km and altitude coverage of up to 30,500 m. |
| — | IDZ-50 | Long-range IFF Mark XIIA interrogator intended for integration with long-range surveillance radars and air-defence systems. It supports Modes 1, 2, 3/A, C and S as well as Mode 5 when equipped with cryptographic equipment. |
| — | ISZ-50 | Medium-range IFF Mark XIIA interrogator intended for stationary and mobile radar systems. It supports Modes 1, 2, 3/A, C and S and Mode 5 when equipped with cryptographic equipment. |
| — | IKZ-50P | Short-range IFF Mark XIIA interrogator intended primarily for SHORAD and VSHORAD systems. It can operate with fixed or rotating antennas and provides an interface for integration with man-portable air-defense systems. |
| — | Passive Location System | A four-station passive air-surveillance system combining passive coherent location (PCL) and Passive Emitter Tracking (PET). PCL uses signals of opportunity, including FM radio, DVB-T and GSM, while PET detects emissions from airborne radar, communications, IFF and navigation equipment. As the system does not transmit radar signals, its operation is difficult to detect using hostile electronic-support measures. |
| — | IFF Mark XIIA family | A family of IFF equipment developed for integration with radar, air-defence and command-and-control systems, including the IDZ-50, ISZ-50 and IKZ-50P interrogators. |
| | PRP-25M / PRP-25S | ELINT/electronic-support stations used for reconnaissance and geolocation of airborne radio-frequency emitters. They operate in the 0.5–18 GHz frequency range and use direction finding, triangulation and time difference of arrival techniques. |
| | N22-N(3D) | Mobile three-dimensional medium-range surveillance radar operating in the S band. It is intended for tactical air-defence units and can detect low-flying targets. Its instrumented range is 60 or 100 km, depending on the operating mode, and it can track up to 100 targets. |
| | BYSTRA | A redeployable three-dimensional multifunction radar designed for SHORAD and VSHORAD units. It can detect and track aircraft, helicopters including hovering helicopters, missiles, unmanned aerial vehicles and mortar rounds, and can determine mortar launch and impact locations. |
| | SOŁA | A redeployable three-dimensional multifunction radar intended for air-defence units. In addition to conventional aircraft it can detect UAVs, hovering helicopters and mortar rounds. It can operate independently or as a sensor within an automated air-defence system and provides a target-information refresh time of one second. |
| — | ARS-800 | X-band radar designed for maritime patrol aircraft. It provides 360-degree surveillance, can track up to 200 targets and offers selectable surveillance ranges of up to 220 km (120 nmi). It also provides synthetic-aperture radar imaging. |
| | TRS-15 | Mobile three-dimensional medium-range air-surveillance radar operating in the S band. It has an instrumented range of 240 km and altitude coverage up to 30,000 m and is designed to detect both conventional and low-flying targets. |
| | LIWIEC | A weapon locating radar used for artillery reconnaissance and counter-battery fire. It detects and tracks artillery projectiles and calculates the location of hostile firing positions as well as projectile impact points. |
| | RM-100 | Mobile X-band frequency-modulated continuous-wave radar designed for coastal and maritime surveillance. It is a low-probability-of-intercept radar with an instrumented range of 0.25–48 nautical miles and a deployable 20-metre antenna mast. |

=== Command-and-control and fire-control systems ===
| Image | Product | Description |
|---|---|---|
| — | SZAFRAN | Automated tactical command and control information system supporting command processes at battalion, brigade, division and corps level. It provides a battlefield picture on digital maps and supports standardized military messaging and NATO tactical symbology. |
| — | ŁOWCZA-3 | Automated air-defence command-and-control system intended for battalion and regiment level. It receives and correlates information about the air situation, assists operators in evaluating threats and selecting targets and supports the control of missile, artillery and mixed air-defence batteries. |
| — | REGA | Modular air-defence command-and-control system intended for tactical units from battery to squad level. It distributes air-situation data and target assignments and can control up to eight weapons. |
| — | SDP-20 SAMOC | Mobile air-defence command post intended for brigade-level command and control. The system provides air-situation processing, threat evaluation, mission planning and fire control and was designed to provide interoperability between legacy and NATO-standard air-defence systems. |
| | BLENDA | Integrated anti-aircraft artillery system intended to engage low-altitude air targets and lightly armoured ground and surface targets. The system integrates sensors, command-and-control equipment and gun or gun-missile effectors. |
| — | WG-35 | Fire-control vehicle for 35 mm anti-aircraft artillery batteries. It can control up to eight guns and incorporates a multisensor electro-optical tracking head, laser rangefinder and automatic target-tracking equipment. |

=== Air-defence effectors ===
| Image | Product | Description |
|---|---|---|
| — | SA-35 | Self-propelled 35 mm anti-aircraft gun system. The gun has a rate of fire of 550 rounds per minute, an elevation range from −10° to +85° and two 100-round magazines. The system was publicly presented at MSPO in 2024. |
| | OSU-35K | Naval 35 mm close-in weapon system intended to engage aircraft, helicopters, unmanned aerial vehicles, missiles and surface targets. Depending on ammunition, the system has an effective engagement distance of up to 5,500 m and altitude of up to 3,500 m. |
| | A-35 / AG-35 | Towed 35 mm automatic anti-aircraft guns intended to engage aircraft, helicopters, cruise missiles, UAVs and lightly armoured ground and surface targets. The A-35 is primarily remotely controlled by the WG-35 fire-control vehicle, while the AG-35 incorporates an electro-optical tracking head, ballistic computer and video tracker. |
| | POPRAD | Self-propelled VSHORAD missile system designed to detect, identify and engage low-altitude air targets. It carries four ready-to-fire Grom or Piorun missiles and four reloads. Its stated engagement envelope is 500–5,500 m in range and 10–3,500 m in altitude. |

=== New and developmental systems ===
| Image | Product | Description |
|---|---|---|
| — | SAJNA | Multifunction three-dimensional fire-control radar developed primarily for the NAREW short-range air-defence system. It is designed to detect, track and classify aircraft, helicopters, UAVs, guided and unguided missiles, short-range ballistic missiles, artillery projectiles and mortar rounds. SAJNA uses a two-dimensional AESA based on gallium nitride MMIC transmit/receive modules and can operate either with its antenna rotating for 360-degree coverage or stationary for rapid sector scanning. |
| | TUGA | Compact software-defined four-dimensional radar using an AESA antenna and FMCW technology. It is designed for detection and tracking of aircraft, helicopters and UAVs and measures range, azimuth, elevation and radial velocity. Its modular design allows portable, vehicle-mounted and fixed-site applications. |
| — | Passive Location Radar (PLR) | Passive air-surveillance radar developed from PIT-RADWAR's PCL/PET technology. It combines Passive Coherent Location, using signals of opportunity such as mobile-phone and digital-television transmissions, with Passive Emitter Tracking of signals emitted by airborne platforms. In September 2025, a contract was signed for 46 PLR systems for the NAREW programme. |
