= P-18PL =

Polish mobile VHF early-warning radar

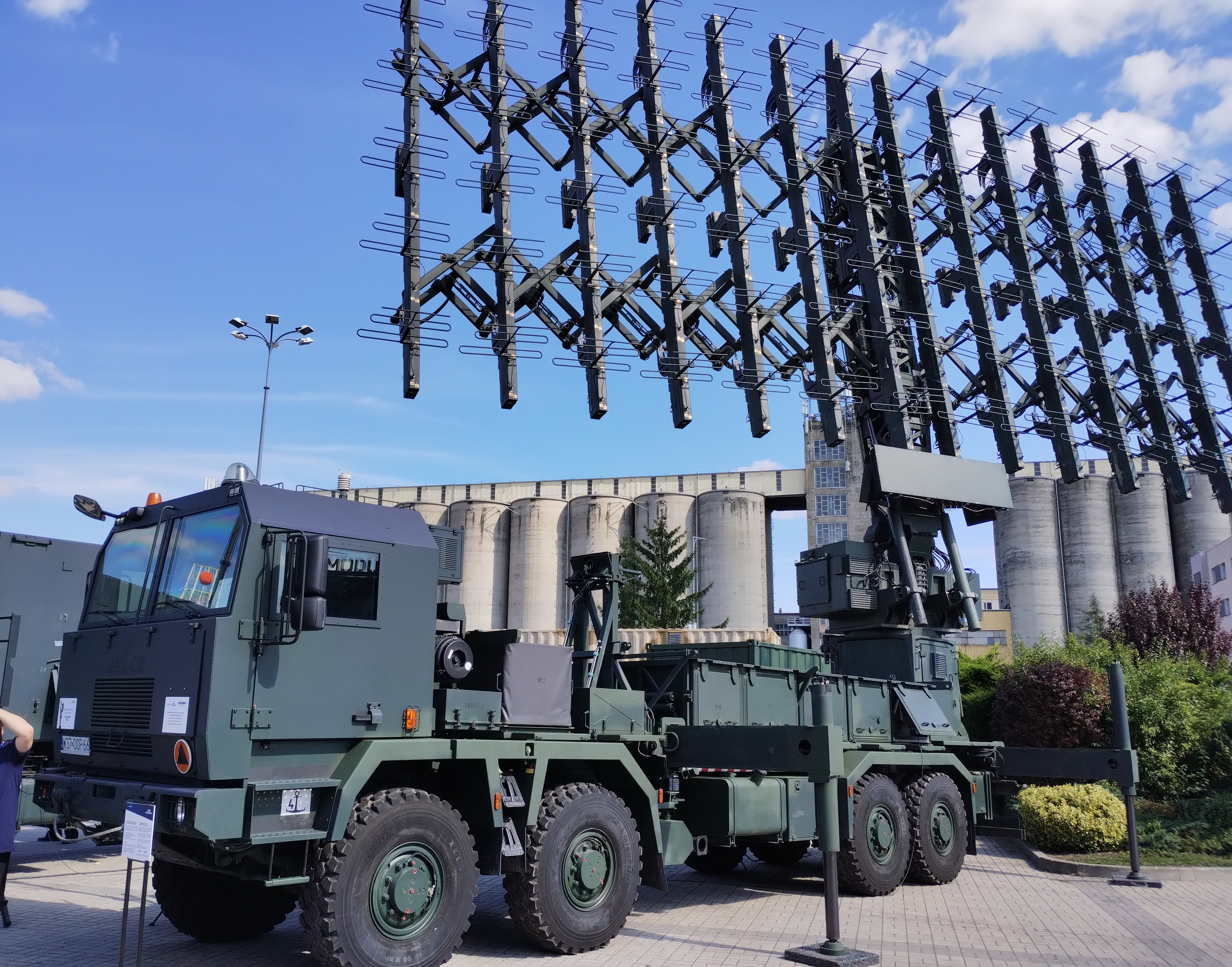
- P-18PL prototype at MSPO 2023
- Country of origin: Poland
- Manufacturer: PIT-RADWAR
- Designer: PIT-RADWAR; Military University of Technology
- Type: Mobile 3D early-warning radar
- Frequency: VHF (metre band)
- Beamwidth: 6° azimuth × 12° elevation (prototype)
- Range: Instrumented: up to 900 km (560 mi)
- Altitude: Up to 160 km (99 mi) (published prototype data)
- Height: 6 m (20 ft) (deployed prototype array)
- Width: 14 m (46 ft) (deployed prototype array)
- Azimuth: 360° (rotating antenna); 90° (stationary antenna)
- Elevation: 25° (rotating antenna); 45° (stationary antenna)
- Precision: 30 m (98 ft) in range; 0.3° in azimuth (prototype)
- Power: >120 kW (solid-state transmitter)

The P-18PL is a Polish mobile three-dimensional VHF early-warning and preliminary target-indication radar developed by PIT-RADWAR and the Military University of Technology. It uses an active electronically scanned array (AESA), electronic steering of the transmitted beam and digital formation of receive beams. Despite its designation and the metre-wave operating band it shares with the Soviet-designed P-18 radar, the P-18PL is a new Polish design rather than a modernisation of the P-18.

According to its developers, the radar is designed to detect and track conventional aircraft, unmanned aerial vehicles, hovering helicopters, cruise missiles, ballistic missiles, hypersonic targets and aircraft incorporating stealth technology. Its main function is to provide early warning and initial target data to command systems and more accurate fire-control radars. The lower resolution characteristic of VHF radars means that the P-18PL is not intended to provide direct missile-guidance data.

In December 2023, the Polish Armament Agency ordered 24 P-18PL systems for more than 3.1 billion złoty, with deliveries scheduled for 2027–2035. As of July 2026, containers for the WW-18 indicator vehicles were in production at the PIT-RADWAR facility in Ostrów Mazowiecka.

== Development ==
Work on a new Polish VHF radar began in 2011 at Bumar Elektronika, subsequently renamed PIT-RADWAR. On 19 December 2012, a consortium led by PIT-RADWAR and including the Military University of Technology signed a research and development agreement under Competition No. 3/2012 of the National Centre for Research and Development. The officially recorded project value was 54.4 million złoty, of which 46 million złoty was public funding. The project implementation period eventually ran from 19 December 2012 to 18 December 2022.

The original deadline was December 2016. It was subsequently extended to 2018, 2020, 2021 and finally 2022. Among the causes of the delay was the absence of preliminary tactical and technical requirements when the project began. A critical review conducted between November 2014 and June 2016 produced recommendations intended to align the design with the requirements of the Polish Armed Forces.

The first complete prototype was finished in 2017, while development resulted in the target prototype configuration in 2019. Factory testing was completed in 2020, followed by qualification trials conducted at a certified laboratory of the Polish Air Force Institute of Technology. The qualification programme ended successfully in December 2022, allowing negotiations for series production to begin.

In April 2023, the prototype received second place in the Innovations for Security and Defense competition.

== Design ==
The configuration contracted in 2023 consists of three principal elements: the WA-18 antenna vehicle, the WW-18 indicator and operator vehicle, and the JZ-18T power-supply unit. In the prototype configuration, the WA-18 was carried by an eight-wheel-drive Jelcz P882 truck, while the WW-18 used a six-wheel-drive Jelcz P662 chassis. The prototype power unit, designated JZ-18, was installed in a container on a two-axle trailer.

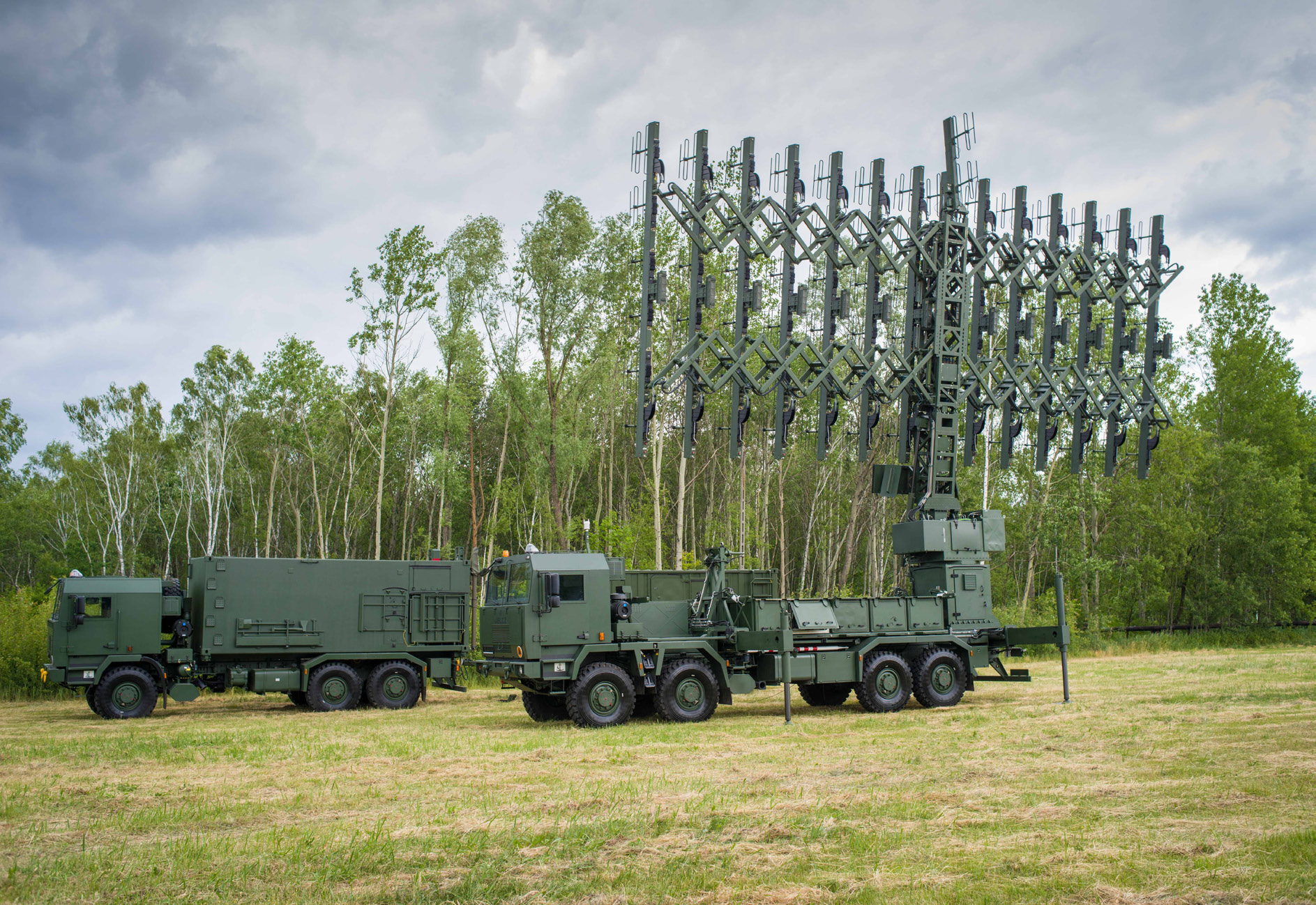
The P-18PL prototype deployed in 2021. The production configuration ordered in 2023 was expected to differ from the prototype.

The prototype's active antenna comprised 84 solid-state transmit–receive modules, arranged in 14 columns and six rows and coupled to Yagi–Uda radiators. When deployed, the array measured approximately 14 m (46 ft) in width and 6 m (20 ft) in height. In its transport configuration, the antenna vehicle did not exceed 2.5 m (8.2 ft) in width or 4 m (13 ft) in height. The reported prototype beam width was approximately 6° in azimuth and 12° in elevation.

The radar uses electronic control of the transmitted beam and digital formation of receive beams in both azimuth and elevation. PIT-RADWAR describes it as having a software-defined architecture. Its distributed, air-cooled, solid-state transmitter has a stated output of more than 120 kW. The radar can use either horizontal or vertical polarisation.

The WA-18 incorporates the antenna, signal-processing equipment, tracking processor, control and diagnostic systems, navigation equipment and an integrated IDZ-50 identification friend or foe interrogator. The interrogator conforms to Mark XIIA and supports Modes 1, 2, 3/C, 5 and S.

The WW-18 contains two operator positions, radar displays and wired and radio communications equipment. One operator station can be removed from the vehicle and connected to the radar by up to 1 km (0.62 mi) of fibre-optic cable. The operator display can also present the estimated strength, frequency range and direction of jamming signals.

The power-supply unit contains two generator sets. One is sufficient to power the radar, while the second serves as a reserve. The radar may also be connected to an external power supply. Published information-exchange interfaces include ASTERIX, AWCIES and dedicated protocols. Deployment from travelling configuration is stated to take less than 30 minutes.

== Operating modes and performance ==
PIT-RADWAR's product data list selectable instrumented ranges of 250, 350, 450, 600 and 900 km (560 mi). With the antenna rotating, the radar provides 360° azimuth coverage and 25° elevation coverage. With the antenna stopped, electronic scanning covers a 90° sector in azimuth and 45° in elevation.

More detailed figures published for the prototype distinguish between rotating and stationary modes. In rotating long-range modes, targets could be detected at instrumented ranges of up to 450 km (280 mi) and at altitudes of up to 120 km (75 mi). The receive beams covered 25° in elevation during search and up to 45° during tracking. Information-update periods varied between 6 and 30 seconds.

In stationary very-long-range modes, the prototype electronically scanned a sector of ±45° in azimuth and 0–40° in elevation, extendable to 50° while tracking. The listed instrumented ranges were 600 and 900 km (560 mi), with a maximum reported target altitude of 160 km (99 mi). The corresponding update periods were approximately 8 or 12 seconds. These modes were intended particularly for the detection and tracking of ballistic missiles and high-altitude hypersonic targets.

Published prototype accuracy was approximately 0.3° in azimuth and 30 m (98 ft) in range. A 2024 sponsored technical article prepared in cooperation with PIT-RADWAR stated that the processing system could track up to 400 objects simultaneously, automatically assigning a target classification to each track.

Manufacturer and project documentation also list a passive operating mode. An early development description stated that a station operating passively would receive signals transmitted by other radars of the same type instead of emitting from its own antenna.

The use of metre-band frequencies provides relatively low atmospheric attenuation and different scattering characteristics from those encountered by microwave radars, making the system suitable for long-range warning and as a complement to higher-frequency sensors against low-observable aircraft. The trade-offs include a large antenna and lower angular resolution than that of microwave-band fire-control radars. Detection range against low-altitude aircraft is also limited by terrain and the radar horizon, irrespective of the radar's instrumented range.

== Role and integration ==
The planned roles of the P-18PL include long-range warning against aerodynamic, ballistic and hypersonic threats; initial target indication for short- and medium-range air-defence systems; general airspace surveillance; and support for allied air operations. Target data generated by the radar are intended to cue more precise sensors and weapon-control radars rather than directly control anti-aircraft missiles.

The radar was designed to exchange information with Polish Air Force and air-defence command systems. Its planned final configuration is to operate through the Integrated Air and Missile Defense Battle Command System in support of the short-range Narew air-defence programme and the second phase of the medium-range Wisła programme.

== Procurement and production ==
On 19 December 2023, the Polish Armament Agency and the PGZ–Narew consortium signed executive agreement UW-10 for the delivery and support of 24 P-18PL systems. The contract, valued at more than 3.1 billion złoty, includes training, technical documentation, technical assistance and a logistics package. It was the largest contract in the history of PIT-RADWAR when signed.

Of the 24 ordered systems, 23 were allocated to batteries of the Narew short-range air-defence system and one to military training. Deliveries were scheduled for 2027–2035, with the first system due no later than 2027.

The production version was expected to differ significantly from the qualification prototype because of technological development, component availability and changes introduced following the trials. The first production system was therefore to undergo an expanded test programme before the remaining systems were delivered. By July 2026, PIT-RADWAR's Ostrów Mazowiecka facility was manufacturing containers for the WW-18 vehicles, including their structures, mechanical installation, finishing and quality control.

== Operators ==
- Poland – Polish Armed Forces: 24 systems on order, with deliveries scheduled for 2027–2035.
