= SAJNA (radar) =

Sajna
- Manufacturer: PIT-Radwar
- Type: Multifunction fire-control radar
- Frequency: C band (4–8 GHz)
- Range: 180 km
- Azimuth: 360°
- Elevation: 70°

The Sajna multifunction fire-control radar is a radar intended to serve as the primary radar sensor at battery level for the Narew air-defence system.

In 2012, a consortium consisting of PIT-Radwar (then operating as Bumar Elektronika), the Military University of Technology and the Warsaw University of Technology won a competition organised by the National Centre for Research and Development and began work on a prototype radar. Completion of the project was initially planned for 2017, but development was ultimately completed in 2024. The radar was presented at the International Defence Industry Exhibition (MSPO) in September 2024. Deliveries are expected to begin in 2027.

== Technical characteristics ==
The radar is designed to detect aircraft, unmanned aerial vehicles, helicopters, missiles, including ballistic missiles, as well as artillery and mortar projectiles.

Its active phased-array antenna, based on gallium arsenide semiconductors, can provide all-round coverage by rotating through 360° around its vertical axis. In elevation, the beam is electronically steered and covers a 70° sector. For higher-precision operation and the detection of artillery projectiles, the antenna can remain stationary and operate in a sector-search mode. The radar is equipped with an identification friend or foe (IFF) system. The antenna is mounted on an elevating mast approximately 10 m high.

Sajna operates in the C band (4–8 GHz). Its instrumental range is 180 km and its information refresh time is two seconds. The nominal crew consists of three personnel, although the radar can be operated by two. The operator stations are located in the rear section of the vehicle cab.

The radar is carried on a specially designed five-axle Jelcz P112.57 chassis with 10×10 drive and three steering axles. It is powered by an MTU 6R1500V40 engine with a displacement of 15.6 litres and an output of 430 kW (584 PS). The complete system weighs up to 40 tonnes.

The antenna is liquid-cooled, reducing its thermal signature and making detection and engagement more difficult. The crew cab is armoured, and the radar can operate together with radar-signal decoys intended to confuse anti-radiation missiles. The radar can also be operated remotely.
