= ZDPSR Bystra =

- ZDPSR Bystra
- Type: Radiolocation station for SHORAD / VSHORAD
- Place of origin: Poland

Service history
- In service: 2019 – present
- Used by: Polish Land Forces

Production history
- Manufacturer: PIT-Radwar

Specifications
- Crew: 2

ZDPSR Bystra – A deployable radar station manufactured by PIT-RADWAR S.A., installed on the Żubr-P armored vehicle. A three-coordinate station equipped with an active electronic scanning antenna (AESA). Used in short-range (SHORAD) and very short-range (VSHORAD) air defense systems. It has Counter Rocket, Artillery, and Mortar capabilities.

== Description ==
ZDPSR BYSTRA is designed to detect and indicate targets in short-range anti-aircraft missile systems used to protect tactical combat groups from air attack means. Bystra is a multifunctional and multi-task radar with versatile capabilities and applications, capable of detecting and tracking typical air threats such as combat aircraft and helicopters (also in hover), missiles, as well as unmanned aerial vehicles and mortar grenades.

== Service history ==
On September September, 2019, a contract worth PLN 634.9 million was signed for the delivery of 16 radar stations for the Polish Army. Deliveries are planned for 2022–2025. On October 4, 2022, it was announced that a framework agreement had been signed for the purchase and conversion of PSR-A Pilica to the Pilica+ standard, which involves the addition of the radar to the system.

== Specifications ==
- IFF Identification System; Mod 1, 2, 3/A, C (SIF), Mod 4 (SM) and Mod S, ready to work with Mod 5
- Crew: 2

== See also ==
- ZDPSR Soła
