= ORP Wicher =

ORP Wicher (meaning "gale") was a name of two destroyers and one frigate of the Polish Navy:

- ORP Wicher (1928) commissioned in 1930 and sunk during the Invasion of Poland in 1939
- ORP Wicher (1958) commissioned from the Soviet Union in 1958 and scrapped in 1974
- ORP Wicher (2023) is a Type 31 frigate currently under construction.
