= ZDPSR Soła =

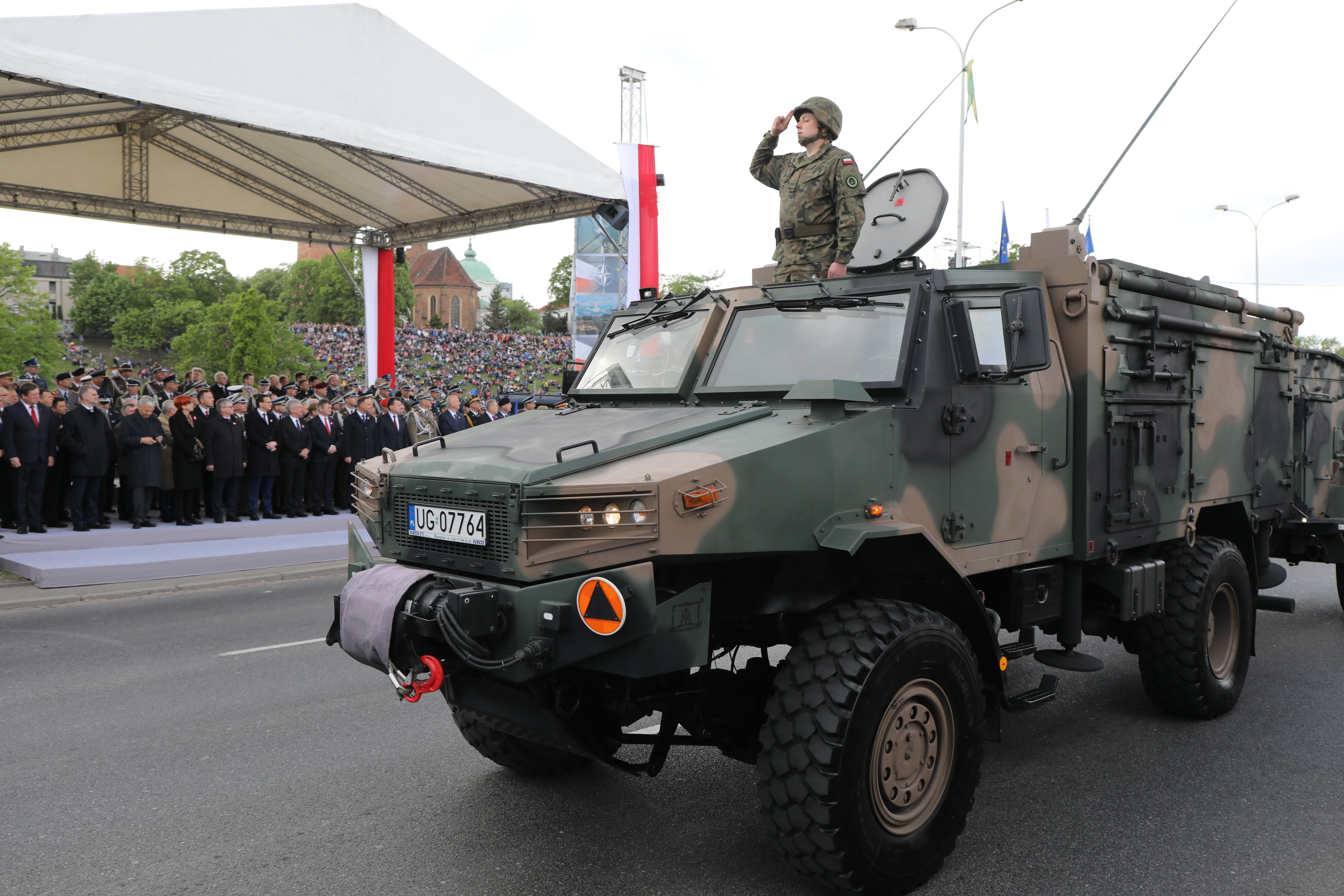
- ZDPSR Soła at military parade in Warsaw
- Type: Radiolocation station for SHORAD / VSHORAD
- Place of origin: Poland

Service history
- In service: 2014 – present
- Used by: Polish Land Forces

Production history
- Produced: 2013-2015
- No. built: 8

Specifications

ZDPSR „Soła” – A deployable radar station manufactured by PIT-Radwar S.A., installed on the Żubr-P armored vehicle. A three-dimensional station equipped with a passive electronic scanning antenna (PESA). Used in short-range (SHORAD) and very short-range (VSHORAD) air defense systems. It has Counter Rocket, Artillery, and Mortar capabilities.

== Description ==
The deployable Radar Station ZDPSR Soła is designed to control the airspace, detect and track the paths of objects detected in a given area. The output data from the radar contains full information about the detected object, including three coordinates of position, speed, course and classification of helicopters as a separate category of targets.

In addition to typical air targets, the radar detects unmanned aerial vehicles and mortar shells. Its main application is in the air defense systems of the land forces to protect troop columns, groups and objects of special importance. SOŁA can operate autonomously, as well as in the air defense system. In OPL modes (ABT-50, ABT-25) direct cooperation with the Łowcza/Rega system is possible.

ZDPSR Soła also indicates targets for batteries and individual SPZR Poprad sets as part of the VSHORAD anti-aircraft defense.

== Service history ==
In 2013, a contract worth PLN 150.7 million was signed for the delivery of 8 radar stations for the Polish Army. The contract was implemented in 2014–2015.

In April 2022, the first two Common Anti-Air Modular Missile system batteries were purchased as part of the Narew program. Each battery includes one ZDPSR Soła. Deliveries of the first battery with a radar station are scheduled for September 2022, and the second set for the turn of 2022 and 2023.

== Specifications ==
- Transmitting beam: electronically controlled in the elevation plane
- Receiving beams: digitally formed beams electronically controlled in the elevation plane
- Rotation speed: 60 / 30 rpm
- IFF: MARK XII/ MARK XIIA, mod. S

== Operators ==
- 4th Zielona Góra Anti-Aircraft Regiment
- 8th Koszalin Anti-Aircraft Regiment
- 15th Gołdap Anti-Aircraft Regiment
- 10th Armored Cavalry Brigade
- 17th Greater Poland Mechanized Brigade
- 12th Mechanized Brigade
- 21st Podhale Rifle Brigade
- Air Force Training Center

== See also ==
- ZDPSR Bystra
