= AMZ Żubr =

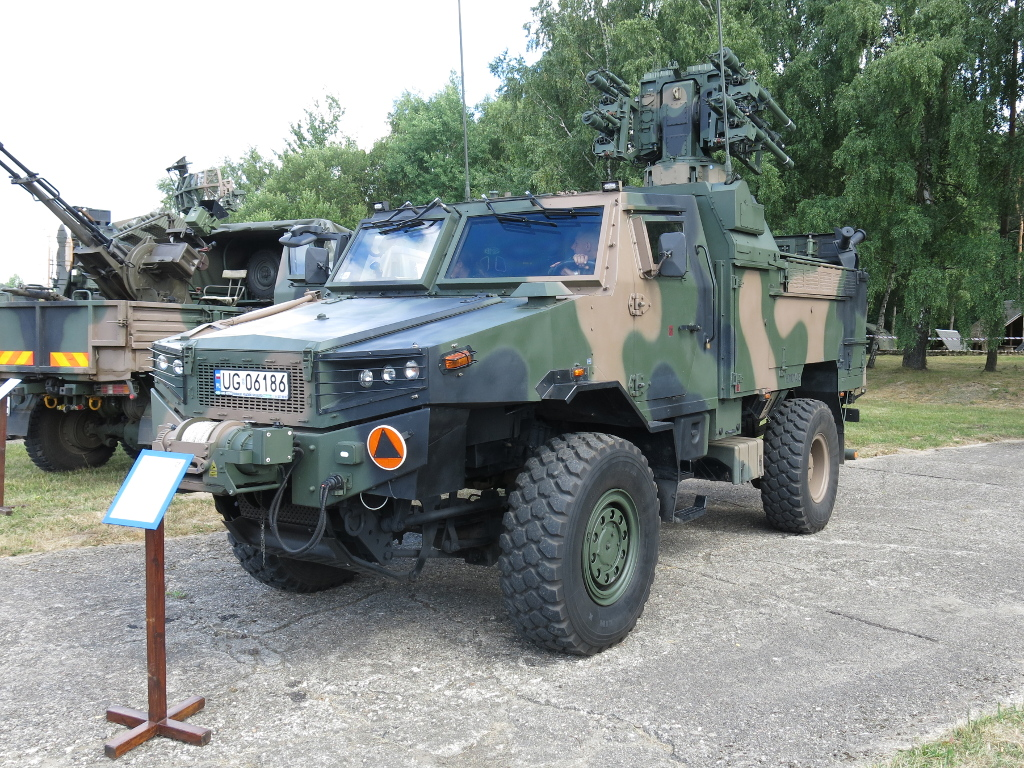
- AMZ Żubr P air defence variant
- Type: Infantry Mobility Vehicle
- Place of origin: Poland

Specifications
- Mass: 15000 kg
- Length: 6.45 m
- Width: 2.45 m
- Height: 2.65 m
- Crew: 10
- Engine: N60 ENT C Iveco Tector; 275 hp
- Suspension: Wheel
- Ground clearance: 0.7 m
- Operational range: 600 km
- Maximum speed: 100 km/h

The AMZ Żubr is an infantry mobility vehicle produced by Poland's AMZ-Kutno which is used by the Polish military. "Żubr" is also the Polish word for wisent. It was designed by AMZ-Kutno and began production in 2008.

The Żubr was designed for enhanced protection against landmines and improvised explosive devices. The vehicle's hull is V-shaped to deflect blasts. The Żubr is armored against 12.7-mm armor-piercing rounds and features a remotely controlled weapons station. The Żubr can carry 2000–5000 kg within the vehicle and can tow an additional 1500 kg. The vehicle is all wheel drive. It was designed to be transported by the C-130 Hercules.

== Types ==
- Żubr AWR - abandoned version of reconnaissance vehicle for Rak module, to be replaced by Rosomak AWR 8x8 reconnaissance version.
- Żubr MRAP - standard troop-transporting armored car, can carry 10 fully equipped soldiers. The Żubr MRAP, is based on the Iveco EuroCargo vehicle, which is produced in Poland. Not produced.
- Żubr WD - command vehicle, not produced.
- Żubr P - Poprad variant for air defense; equipped with Grom or Piorun AA missiles.
- Żubr ZDPSR Soła - Soła PESA air surveillance variant.
- Żubr ZDPSR Bystra - Bystra AESA air surveillance variant.

== Operators ==
- Poland - 87 in use (8 on ZDPSR Soła radar and 79 on POPRAD missile system), 17 to be delivered (ZDPSR Bystra radar).
