= List of man-portable anti-tank systems =

The following is a list of MANPATS.

Three main categories of MANPATS are in use, which are split into the following lists.

1. Rocket launchers launch unguided self-propelled projectiles.
2. Recoilless weapons launch unguided projectiles. They are accelerated by ejecting a counter-mass, such as a propellant gas, from the weapon's rear. There are two categories of recoilless weapons:
  - Recoilless rifles have a rifled barrel and use spin stabilised projectiles (example: Carl Gustav 8.4 cm)
  - Recoilless guns are smoothbore and shoot fin stabilised projectiles (examples: AT4, MATADOR RGW 90)
3. Anti-tank guided missiles (ATGM)

== Modern era MANPATS ==
List of rocket launchers that entered service after the end of the Cold War (since 1990).

Model	Manufacturers / designers	Image	Origin	Use	In service since	Warhead calibre	Notes
Rocket launchers
MARA	CITEFA / Fray Luis Beltrán munition factory		Argentina	Disposable	2005	78 mm	
PF-89	Norinco (China North Industries Corporation)		China	Disposable	1993	80 mm	5 warheads (HEAT, incendiary, HESH, HEAT tandem, HEAT/thermobaric tandem)
Panzerfaust 3	Dynamit Nobel AG		Germany	Reusable	1997	110 mm	Development started in 1978
M90 Stršljen / RBR 120	Sloboda		MacedoniaSerbia	Disposable	2002	120 mm	
M72E5 LAW	Nammo Raufoss AS in cooperation with Talley Defense (absorbed into Nammo in 2007)		Norway; United States	Disposable	1983	66 mm	Many variants in continuous production
Yasin (RPG)	Hamas	–	Palestine	Reusable	2004	85 mm	It is a variant of the RPG-2
MRO	NPO Bazalt		Russia	Disposable	2003	72.5 mm	Further evolution of the RPO-A Shmel Variants: MRO-A (thermobaric); MRO-O (WP Smoke warhead), MRO-Z (Incendiary warhead)
RPG-28	NPO Bazalt		Russia	Disposable	2011	125 mm	
RPG-30	NPO Bazalt		Russia	Disposable	2013	105 mm	
RPG-32 Barkas	NPO Bazalt	–	Russia	Reusable	2012	72.5 mm / 105 mm	JADARA is producing it as well under license.
RShG-2 "Agleni-2", or 6G31	NPO Bazalt		Russia	Disposable	2003	72.5 mm	Evolution to the RPG-26, using a larger warhead, and a derivative of the TBG-7V thermobaric rocket for the RPG-7
Alcotán-100 (M2)	Instalaza SA		Spain	Fire unit reusable, tube disposable	1998	100 mm	Variants: ALCOTAN-AT (M2): Anti-tank behind ERA; ALCOTAN-BIV (M2): Dual purpose (anti-armour + fragmentation); ALCOTAN-ABK (M2): Anti-bunker; ALCOTAN-MP (M2): Multi-purpose, three different modes (impact, impact delay, and airburst)
CS-70	Instalaza SA	–	Spain	Fire unit reusable, tube disposable	2023	72 mm	–
C90-CR (M3)	Instalaza SA		Spain	Fire unit reusable, tube disposable	1990	90 mm	Warhead variants: CR (M3): hollow-charge warhead; CR-RB (M3 / M3.5): hollow-charge warhead; CR-AM (M3.5): shaped charge warhead with anti-personal fragmentation; CR-FIM (M3.5): incendiary and smoke, red phosphorus; CR-BK (M3.5): tandem warhead against bunkers, buildings, fortifications, CR-IN (M3): training inert warhead
Hispano MPW	Instalaza SA	–	Spain	Reusable	2025	90 mm	Same munition as the C90.
Kestrel	NCSIST		Taiwan	Fire unit reusable, tube disposable	2015	110 mm	Variants: HEAT; HESH; Long Range; Guided missile in development based on Kestrel
PSRL-1	AirTronicUSA		United States	Reusable	2017	93 mm	American RPG-7, warhead variants: SR-H1: HEAT; SR-T1 / SR-T2: training
VE-NILANGAL Ve-Nilangal	CAVIM	–	Venezuela	–	–	72 mm	–
Recoilless rifles
Carl Gustaf M4	Saab Bofors Dynamics		Sweden	Reusable	2014	84 mm	
Recoilless guns
PF-98	Norinco (China North Industries Corporation)		China	Reusable	1998	120 mm	Successor of the Type 78 in the PLA.
RGW 60	Dynamit Nobel AG		Germany	Disposable	–	60 mm	4 warheads: HEAT; HEAT MP (Multi-Purpose); HESH; ASM
RGW 90 MATADOR	Dynamit Nobel AG DSTA Rafael Advanced Defense Systems		Germany; Israel; Singapore	Disposable	2000	90 mm	
RGW 110	Dynamit Nobel AG	–	Germany	Disposable	2023	110 mm	Hungary, first client of this weapon, contract 2022
Anti-tank guided missiles
Shershen	CJSC SRPC, JSC Peleng. Kyiv Design Bureau "Luch"		Belarus; Ukraine	Fire unit reusable, tube disposable	2012	130 mm 152 mm	Belarus licensed variants of Stugna-P / Skif.
MSS-1.2	SIATT		Brazil; Italy	Fire unit reusable, tube disposable	2009	127 mm	OTO Melara initially co-developed the missile, starting in 1985, but withdrew from the program and ceded its share.
HJ-12 Red Arrow	Norinco		China	Fire unit reusable, tube disposable	2021	130 mm	
Eryx	Aérospatiale then, MBDA France now		France	Fire unit reusable, tube disposable	1993	136 mm	
Akeron MP	MBDA France; Saab Bofors Dynamics Switzerland		France; Switzerland	Fire unit reusable, tube disposable	2017	140 mm	The missile design is French, the warhead is close to that of the NLAW, developed and manufactured by Saab in Switzerland (former RUAG)
PARS 3 MR	MBDA Deutschland, Diehl BGT Defence		Germany; France; United Kingdom; Netherlands	Fire unit reusable, tube disposable	Cancelled	159 mm	France, the UK and the Netherlands withdrew from the common development program. Infantry variant therefore cancelled, only the PARS-3 LR variant used by German Army Tiger Helicopter.
Enforcer	MBDA Deutschland		Germany	Fire unit reusable, tube disposable	2024	90 mm	A light guided missile, with some potential alternative variants are to be developed. TDW warhead.
Amogha missile	Bharat Dynamics Limited		India	Fire unit reusable, tube disposable	In development	–	3 variants
MPATGM	DRDO VEM Technologies		India	Fire unit reusable, tube disposable	2023-4	120 mm	
Spike	Rafael Advanced Defense Systems	Spike LR	Israel	Fire unit reusable, tube disposable	–	110 mm 130 mm	Multiple variants that are in this MANPATS category: Mini-Spike; Spike SR; Spike MR; Spike LR / LR II; Spike ER / ER II
Teaser	Israel Aerospace Industries	–	Israel	Fire unit reusable, tube disposable	In development	–	
Type 01 LMAT (or XATM-5)	Defense Agency Technical Research and Development Institute Kawasaki Heavy Industries		Japan	Fire unit reusable, tube disposable	2001	140 mm	
Terminator	Jadara EDS, KADDB	–	Jordan	Fire unit reusable, tube disposable	2020	107 mm	Partnership with Azerbaijan in discussion
Pirat PPK Light ATGM	Kyiv Design Bureau "Luch", Mesko, CRW Telesystem-Mesko		Poland; Ukraine	Fire unit reusable, tube disposable	2025	107 mm	Ordered by Poland
MOSKIT Long range ATGM	Kyiv Design Bureau "Luch", Mesko, CRW Telesystem-Mesko		Poland; Ukraine	Fire unit reusable, tube disposable	2025	–	Ordered by Poland
9M133 Kornet	Degtyarev plant, KBP Instrument Design Bureau		Russia	Fire unit reusable, tube disposable	1998	152 mm	Five variants used (HEAT, thermobaric, or blast fragmentation warheads)
AT-1K Raybolt	Hanwha Defense LIG Nex1		South Korea	Fire unit reusable, tube disposable	2017	150 mm	
Alcotán MRM	Instalaza SA		Spain	Fire unit reusable, tube disposable	In development	100 mm	
RBS 56 BILL 2	Saab Bofors Dynamics RUAG		Sweden; Switzerland	Fire unit reusable, tube disposable	1999	150 mm	Major upgrade with OTA capacity with special warhead made by RUAG. Saab acquired the designer / manufacturer of the warhead in 2007 and maintained the activity locally.
NLAW	Saab Bofors Dynamics; Saab Bofors Dynamics Switzerland; Thales Air Defence UK		Sweden; Switzerland; United Kingdom	Fire unit reusable, tube disposable	2009	150 mm	
Karaok	Roketsan	–	Turkey	Fire unit reusable, tube disposable	2022	125 mm	
OMTAS	Roketsan		Turkey	Fire unit reusable, tube disposable	2017	160 mm	
Stugna-P	Kyiv Design Bureau "Luch"		Ukraine	Fire unit reusable, tube disposable	2011	130 mm	
RK-3 Corsar	Kyiv Design Bureau "Luch"		Ukraine	Fire unit reusable, tube disposable	2017	107 mm	
LMM Martlet	Thales Air Defence		United Kingdom	Fire unit reusable, tube disposable	2021	76 mm	Multi-role missile, usable against air targets, light boats, and armoured vehicles, laser guided. The anti-armour surface-to-surface variant isn't its primary role though
FGM-148 Javelin	Texas Instruments; Martin Marietta (now Raytheon Technologies & Lockheed Martin)		United States	Fire unit reusable, tube disposable	1996	127 mm	
FGM-172 SRAW	Lockheed Martin		United States	Fire unit reusable, tube disposable	2002	139 mm	Only 960 produced, used by USA and Israel, remained 4 years in service
Close-Combat Missile System – Heavy (CCMS-H)	–	–	United States	Reusable	2032	–	BGM-71 TOW successor in development / selection

== Cold War era MANPATS ==
List of MANPATS that entered service during the Cold War (1946–1989).

Model	Manufacturers and designers	Image	Origin	Use	In service since	Warhead calibre	Notes
Rocket launchers
FHJ-84	Norinco	–	China	Reusable	1984	62 mm	
Type 69 RPG	Norinco		China	Reusable	1970	85 mm	–
RPG-75	Zeveta a.s.		Czechoslovakia	Disposable	1975	68 mm	
AC 300 Jupiter	Luchaire SA; MBB		France; West Germany	Fire unit reusable, tube disposable	Mid 1980s	115 mm	A MILAN 2 warhead was mounted to an Armbrust launcher, but never placed in production.
Dard 120	Societe Europeenne de Propulsion (became SNECMA)	–	France	Fire unit reusable, tube disposable	Mid 1980s	120 mm	Competition lost with the Jupiter 300 against the APILAS for a rocket launcher with more power than the LRAC F1. The French Army has used it, but more information is needed. Evolution of the DARD 90, very similar to LRAC F1.
LRAC F1	Luchaire SA / Manufacture Nationale d'Armes de Saint-Etienne		France	Reusable	1972	89 mm	
LRAC 73 mm Modèle 1950	–		France	Reusable	1950	73 mm	Development financed by the Marshall Plan.
SARPAC	Hotchkiss-Brandt		France	Disposable	1975	68 mm	Limited production.
WASP 58	Luchaire SA	–	France	Fire unit reusable, tube disposable	1987	58 mm	
Panzerfaust 2 / Panzerfaust 44 mm	Dynamit Nobel AG		West Germany	Reusable	1963	44 mm	HEAT warhead named Panzerfaustgeschoß DM32.
OGMA 37mm	OGMA		Portugal	Reusable	1962	37 mm	37mm SMEB rocket
ARIS IV	Elliniki Biomihania Oplon	–	Greece	Disposable	Cancelled	113 mm	
B-300	Israel Military Industries		Israel	Reusable	1980	82 mm	
RPG-76 Komar	Zakład Sprzętu Precyzyjnego		Polish People's Republic	Disposable	1985	40 mm 68 mm	
RPG-2	Kovrov Mechanical Plant		Soviet Union	Reusable	1949	82 mm	
RPG-7	NPO Bazalt and ZiD		Soviet Union	Reusable	1961	40 – 105 mm	Many variants of warheads in service.
RPG-16	NPO Bazalt	–	Soviet Union	Reusable	1976	58.3 mm	Used mostly by special forces.
RPG-18	NPO Bazalt		Soviet Union	Disposable	1972	64 mm	
RPG-22	NPO Bazalt		Soviet Union	Disposable	1985	72.5 mm	
RPG-26	NPO Bazalt		Soviet Union	Disposable	1985	72.5 mm	
RPG-27	NPO Bazalt		Soviet Union	Disposable	1989	105 mm	
RPG-29	NPO Bazalt		Soviet Union	Reusable	1989	105 mm	
LAW 80	Hunting Engineering		United Kingdom	Disposable	1987	94 mm	
FGR-17 Viper	General Dynamics		United States	Disposable	1983	70 mm	Poor performance, few delivered, quickly cancelled, the Army requirements were the source of the result.
M202A1 FLASH	Northrop Corporation (Electro-Mechanical Division)		United States	Fire unit reusable, tube disposable	1978	4 × 66 mm	Multiple-barrel incendiary rocket launcher.
M72 LAW	Talley Defense Systems		United States	Disposable	1963	66 mm	
MK-153 (SMAW)	McDonnell Douglas; Talley Defense Systems	–	United States	Reusable	1984	83 mm	Derivative of IMI B-300.
M79 Osa (RL-90 M95)	Sloboda		Yugoslavia	Reusable launcher, disposable tube	1979	90 mm	
M80 Zolja	Sloboda		Yugoslavia	Disposable	1980	64 mm	
Recoilless rifles
Carl Gustaf M1 – M3	Saab Bofors Dynamics (at first, Carl Gustafs stads gevärsfaktori)		Sweden	Reusable	1946	84 mm	
Miniman	Saab Bofors Dynamics		Sweden	Reusable	1968	74 mm	
RAK 74 "Raketenrohre NORA"	Waffenfabrik Bern	–	Switzerland	Reusable	1974	83 mm	Project abandoned.
M40 recoilless rifle	Watervliet Arsenal		United States	Reusable	1955	105 mm	
Recoilless guns
APILAS "Armour Piercing Infantry Light Arm System"	GIAT		France	Fire unit reusable, tube disposable	1985	112 mm	Also known as "RAC 112" in the French Army. 120,000 produced by 2006.
Armbrust	Messerschmitt-Bölkow-Blohm		West Germany	Disposable	1978	67 mm	
RPO-A Shmel	Tula (now KDB)		Soviet Union	Disposable	1980s	93 mm	
AT4	Saab Bofors Dynamics		Sweden	Disposable	1987	84 mm	
Raketenrohr 80	Société Anonyme Constructions Mécaniques du Léman (CML)		Switzerland	Reusable	1980	83 mm	
Anti-tank guided missiles
Mathogo	CITEFA		Argentina	–	1978	102 mm	
HJ-8	Norinco		China	Fire unit reusable, tube disposable	1984	120 mm	
SS.10	Nord Aviation		France	–	1955	160 mm	
ENTAC	DTAT; Aérospatiale		France	–	1957	152 mm	
MILAN	At first made by Euromissile (JV Aérospatiale and DaimlerChrysler Aerospace AG), now MBDA		France; West Germany	Fire unit reusable, tube disposable	1972	103 mm, 115 mm	Made under licence by Bharat Dynamics (India) and BAe Dynamics (United Kingdom).
MAPATS (or "Hutra")	IMI Systems		Israel	Fire unit reusable, tube disposable	1985	156 mm	
Type 64 MAT (or KAM-3)	Defense Agency Technical Research and Development Institute; Kawasaki Heavy Industries		Japan	–	1964	120 mm	
Type 79 Jyu-MAT (or KAM-9)	Defense Agency Technical Research and Development Institute; Kawasaki Heavy Industries; Daicel		Japan	Fire unit reusable, tube disposable	1984	153 mm	
Type 87 Chū-MAT (or Shin Chu-MAT)	Defense Agency Technical Research and Development Institute; Kawasaki Heavy Industries; Mitsubishi Motors		Japan	Fire unit reusable, tube disposable	1989	110 mm	
ZT3 Ingwe	Denel Dynamics		South Africa	Fire unit reusable, tube disposable	1987	127 mm	
9M14 Malyutka	Tula KBP (Tula Machinery Design Bureau)		Soviet Union	–	1963	125 mm	
9K111 Fagot	Tula KBP (Tula Machinery Design Bureau)		Soviet Union	Fire unit reusable, tube disposable	1970	120 mm	
9M113 Konkurs	Tula KBP (Tula Machinery Design Bureau); Tulsky Oruzheiny Zavod		Soviet Union	Fire unit reusable, tube disposable	1974	135 mm	
9K115 Metis	Tula KBP (Tula Machinery Design Bureau); Tulsky Oruzheiny Zavod		Soviet Union	Fire unit reusable, tube disposable	1982	94 mm	
RBS 56 BILL	Bofors		Sweden	Fire unit reusable, tube disposable	1988	150 mm	
RB 53 Bantam	Bofors		Sweden	Reusable	1963	110 mm	
Cobra	Contraves AG; Oerlikon / Bölkow		Switzerland; West Germany	–	1957	100 mm	Considered as most effective anti-tank missile in the 50s
Mamba	Contraves AG; Oerlikon, Bölkow		Switzerland; West Germany	–	1957	120 mm	
Mosquito	Contraves AG; Oerlikon, Bölkow		Switzerland; West Germany	–	1964	120 mm	Licensed produced in Italy (Contraves Italiana SpA)
Vigilant	Vickers		United Kingdom	Reusable	1963	131 mm	
BGM-71 TOW	Hughes Aircraft Company		United States	Fire unit reusable, tube disposable	1970	152 mm	
M47 Dragon	Raytheon		United States	Fire unit reusable, tube disposable	1975	127 mm	

== Second World War era rocket launchers ==
List of rocket launchers that entered service during World War II (1939–1945).

Model	Manufacturers / designers	Image	Origin	Use	In service since	Warhead calibre	Notes
Rocket launchers
44M Buzogányvető	Weiss Manfréd Factory		Hungary	Reusable	1944	–	
Type 4	Unknown		Japan	Reusable	1944	70 mm	
PanzerschreckRaketenpanzerbüchse 54	Enzinger Union, HASAG and Jackel		Nazi Germany	Reusable	1943	88 mm	
M1 Bazooka	Several manufacturers over time		United States	Reusable	1942	60 mm	
M20 Super bazooka	Several manufacturers over time		United States	Reusable	1945	89 mm	
Recoilless rifles
Carl Gustaf 20 mm recoilless rifle	Carl Gustafs stads gevärsfaktori		Sweden	Reusable	1942	20 mm	
Recoilless guns
Panzerfaust	HASAG, Werk Schlieben		Nazi Germany	Disposable	1942	100mm 106 mm 149 mm	
Anti-tank missiles
X-7 Rotkäppchen	Ruhrstahl AG	X-7 missile based on air-to-air X-4 shown above, modifications on the tail, remote controlled	Nazi Germany	Fire unit reusable	1945	150 mm	First anti-tank missile, few reports of its use on the Eastern Front, but seems successful.
Other category
PIAT	Imperial Chemical Industries		United Kingdom	Reusable	1942	83 mm	
