= CRW Telesystem-Mesko =

Polish defence electronics company

- Native name: Centrum Rozwojowo-Wdrożeniowe Telesystem-Mesko sp. z o.o.
- Type: Limited liability company
- Industry: Defence
- Founded: 4 March 1988; 38 years ago
- Headquarters: Lubiczów, Gmina Stare Babice, Poland
- Key people: Sylwia Puzewicz (President of the Management Board)
- Owners: Mesko; Mikroel S.A.
- Website: telesystem.eu

CRW Telesystem-Mesko, formally Centrum Rozwojowo-Wdrożeniowe Telesystem-Mesko, is a Polish defence company based in Lubiczów, Gmina Stare Babice, specialising in the development and manufacture of optoelectronic and electronic assemblies for missile and ammunition military systems. CRW has been involved in the development of components for the man-portable air-defense systems, Grom and Piorun, and missile seekers, detection systems, electronics and launch mechanisms.

== History ==
The origins of CRW Telesystem-Mesko are associated with work begun in the early 1990s to develop Poland's own technologies for man-portable air-defense systems. After Poland abandoned cooperation with the Soviet Union on the licensed production of such systems in 1990, work on a domestic system was conducted by Zakłady Metalowe Mesko, the Research and Development Centre in Skarżysko-Kamienna, and the Military University of Technology. In 1991, the university's Institute of Quantum Electronics, under the direction of Professor Zbigniew Puzewicz, began a project concerning receivers for laser and infrared radiation, the results of which were subsequently used in work on a domestic missile guidance system.

In 1993, Centrum Rozwojowo-Wdrożeniowe Telesystem-Mesko was established. Its shareholders were Zakłady Metalowe Mesko and Mikroel, a company formed by specialists from the Military University of Technology's Institute of Quantum Electronics. The new company was intended to provide a link between the university's scientific base and industry and to conduct research, development and implementation work on the detection-and-control section of the emerging Polish MANPADS. Professor Zbigniew Puzewicz became chairman of the company's supervisory board.

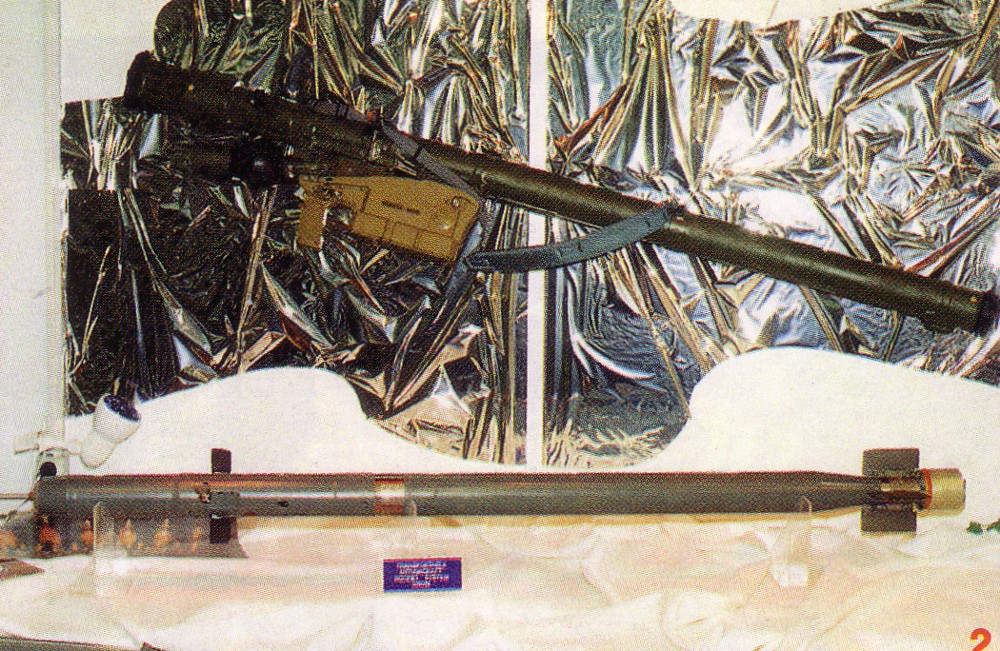
The PZR Grom displayed at MSPO in 1993

In 1994, implementation began of the Strategic Government Programme Modern technologies for the development of air-defence systems for troops and facilities, which included work on the Grom system. CRW Telesystem-Mesko was responsible for the development, testing and implementation of key optoelectronic and electronic assemblies, including components of the seeker coordinator, photodetectors based on indium antimonide (InSb) and lead(II) sulfide (PbS), seeker electronics, fuze electronics and a programmable launch mechanism. The principal research and development work was carried out between 1994 and 1999, followed by an implementation phase in 1999–2000. In 2000, CRW began serial production of missile seekers and other components of the Grom system.

In 2007, Professor Puzewicz's team initiated work on a major modernisation of Grom, which led to the development of the Piorun system. The formal development project, entitled Modernisation of the Grom-M portable anti-aircraft system, codename Piorun, began in November 2010. CRW Telesystem-Mesko developed and implemented, among other elements, new detection systems, a programmable seeker, algorithms increasing resistance to countermeasures, and electronic components of the launch mechanism. Qualification trials were completed in autumn 2015, and a contract for series deliveries was signed in December 2016; the first production batch passed acceptance trials at the end of 2018.

Towards the end of the first decade of the 21st century, the company expanded its activities into guidance systems for artillery ammunition homing on reflected laser radiation. In 2009, representatives of Mesko, CRW Telesystem-Mesko and the Military University of Technology presented the Polish Land Forces with a concept for Polish precision-guided munitions, from which the APR 155 and APR 120 programmes were subsequently developed. In parallel, the company developed its own mobile Kusza system, which was publicly displayed at MSPO in 2011.

In subsequent years CRW also became involved in the Pirat anti-tank guided missile programme, developed by Mesko in cooperation with the Military University of Technology and the Ukrainian Luch Design Bureau. The company developed a missile guidance system for Pirat based on its own digital seeker and participated in the development of laser target-designation systems also used with APR ammunition.

Since the early 2020s, the company has worked on subsequent generations of guidance systems for anti-aircraft weapons, including multispectral seekers, imaging infrared (IIR) seekers and proportional navigation control systems. These technologies were developed for further modernisation of the Piorun family and for the longer-range Grzmot surface-to-air missile.

In 2026, the company was carrying out investments intended to increase its capacity to design, test, integrate and manufacture advanced electronic and optoelectronic systems, including components for Piorun systems and laser-guided weapons.

== Operations ==
CRW Telesystem-Mesko conducts research, development and production work for the defence industry. According to information published by the company, its activities include the design and manufacture of optoelectronic and electronic assemblies, missile seekers, launch mechanisms, authorisation systems, and test and measurement stations.

The company also states that it has capabilities in the production of photodetectors based on indium antimonide (InSb) and lead(II) sulfide (PbS), specialised optics, and hybrid preamplifiers used in guidance systems.

The company cooperates with enterprises of Polska Grupa Zbrojeniowa, including Mesko, as well as with scientific and industrial organisations in Poland and abroad.

=== International cooperation ===
CRW Telesystem-Mesko participates in the Pirat anti-tank guided missile programme, carried out by Mesko in cooperation with the Military University of Technology and the Ukrainian Luch Design Bureau. An agreement concerning development of the system for the Polish Armed Forces was signed on 23 July 2014; at the same time Mesko concluded a cooperation agreement with the Luch Design Bureau. Following the start of the full-scale Russian invasion of Ukraine in 2022, cooperation on some programmes carried out with Ukrainian partners slowed. According to a CRW representative, this did not affect the possibility of launching production of Pirat, as the Polish side had already acquired the knowledge and technologies required for its manufacture.

In 2025, CRW Telesystem-Mesko entered into strategic cooperation with the Israeli company CONTROP Precision Technologies in the field of optoelectronic systems integrated with command and control systems. The cooperation includes the provision of domestic maintenance capabilities, integration of the equipment with Polish command systems, and the gradual development in Poland of capabilities to manufacture selected components. Systems offered jointly include SPEED-ER, SPEED-LR, TORNADO-ER and T-Sight observation systems, equipped with functions for automatic detection, identification and tracking of targets. The systems are offered, among other applications, for the Eastern Shield programme and for the protection of critical infrastructure.

On 19 June 2026, during Eurosatory, Naval Group, Mesko and CRW Telesystem-Mesko signed an agreement concerning the demonstration of the Piorun missile in the Rampart system during future sea trials. The agreement was described as the first stage of cooperation aimed at integrating the missile with the launcher. Under the division of responsibilities, Naval Group is to provide expertise in the integration of weapons, launching systems and equipment with naval vessels, while Mesko and CRW Telesystem-Mesko are to provide expertise related to the production and supply of the missile. Rampart, previously developed under the name MPLS (Multi-purpose and Modular Launching System), is a modular close-in weapon system capable of employing different types of weapons and decoys from a single launcher.

== Products and technologies ==
=== Grom and Piorun systems ===
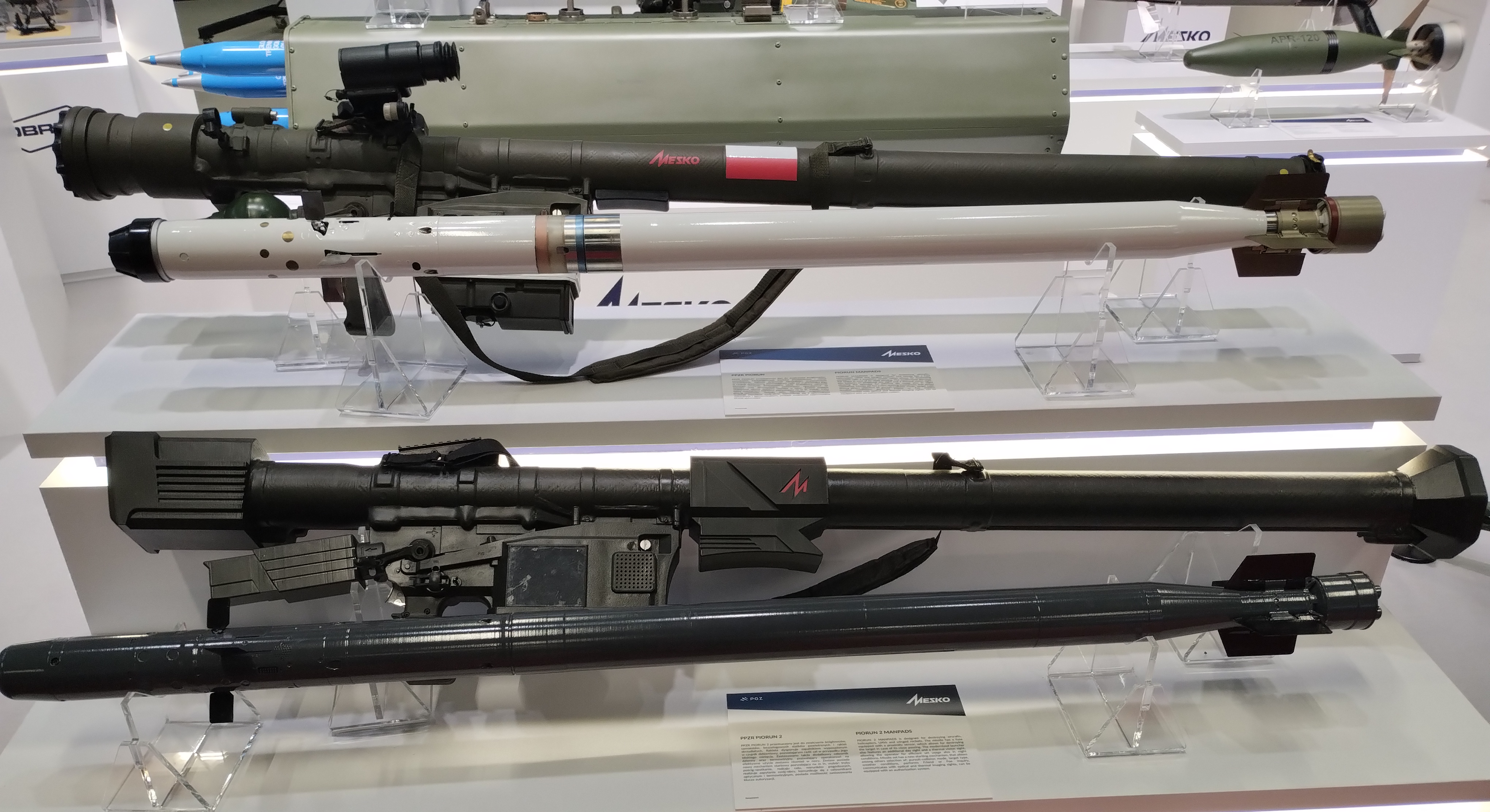
Piorun (top) and a prototype of Piorun 2 at MSPO in 2025

CRW Telesystem-Mesko participated in the development and introduction into production of optoelectronic and electronic components for the Grom and Piorun systems. According to company materials, its products include components of the seeker's optoelectronic path, electronic blocks of the seeker, missile ignition systems, and electronics for the digital launch mechanism.

The company also develops and manufactures launch-mechanism blocks for Grom/Piorun MANPADS launchers.

In 2026, Defence24 reported that CRW Telesystem-Mesko had received the Orzeł Bezpieczeństwa ("Security Eagle") award in the "Innovative Technologies for Security" category for developing next-generation detection-system technologies intended for the modernisation of Piorun and implementation of the Piorun 2 system.

According to ZBIAM, work is under way on a further modernisation of Piorun known as Piorun-NG, including its detection and control section. CRW Telesystem-Mesko coordinates work in this area, as it did for the earlier Grom and Piorun systems. According to the company, Piorun-NG is intended to receive a new seeker with increased capability to detect small targets and improved resistance to countermeasures.

=== Grzmot ===
CRW Telesystem-Mesko participates in work on Grzmot, a longer-range surface-to-air missile being developed jointly with Mesko. In 2023, the company reported development of a missile then referred to as "Piorun+" or "Grzmot" and identified its own multispectral GSNWK seeker and imaging-and-tracking IIR seeker as technologies intended for subsequent generations of Polish surface-to-air missiles. The multispectral seeker was envisaged, among other applications, for short-range missiles with ranges of approximately 10 to 12 km (6.2 to 7.5 mi).

Under the concept presented by CRW in 2023, Grzmot was intended to have a range of approximately 12 km (7.5 mi) and a ceiling of approximately 6 km (3.7 mi). A multispectral seeker was planned, while during the initial phase of flight the missile was to be guided within a laser beam. In May of the same year, then-president of CRW Telesystem-Mesko Janusz Noga stated that the heavier Grzmot missile was being developed on the basis of experience gained during development of Piorun.

In later Mesko materials, Grzmot is presented as a system separate from the concurrently developed Piorun-NG. According to the manufacturer, the results of advanced development work and firing-range trials of new guidance systems are intended to enable introduction of Grzmot with a range of up to 12 km (7.5 mi), for use in mobile air-defence systems protecting Polish Land Forces sub-units.

=== Laser target-designation systems ===
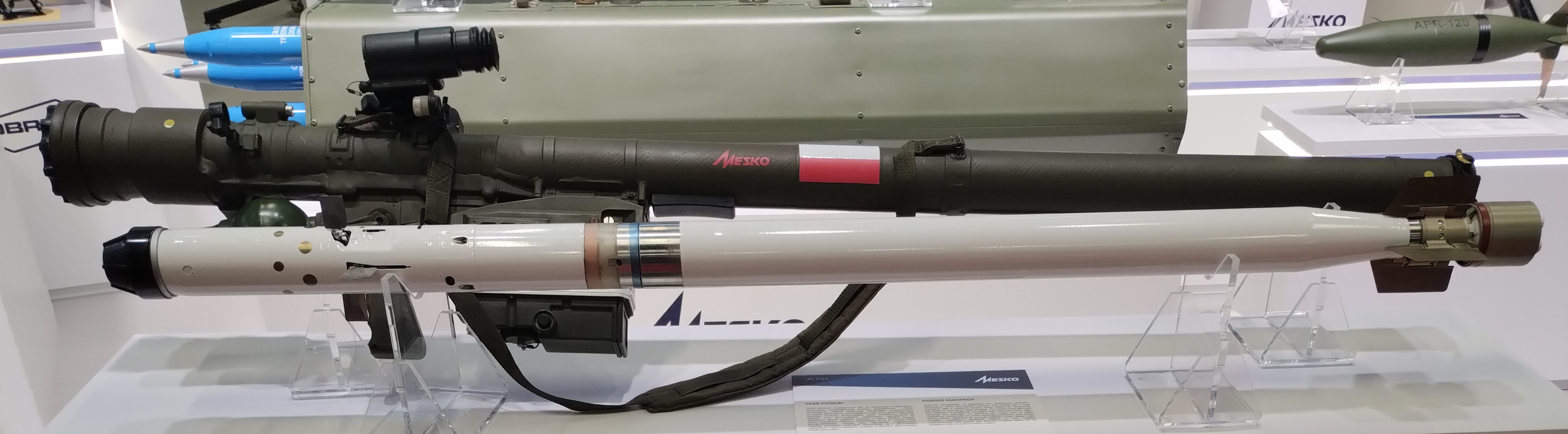
A Piorun man-portable air-defence system

The company's product range includes laser target-designation systems intended for guiding precision-guided munitions, missiles and laser-guided aerial bombs. According to the manufacturer, the LPD-A system uses an Nd:YAG laser operating at a wavelength of 1064 nm and can both designate a target and measure its distance using a laser rangefinder.

CRW Telesystem-Mesko participates in the Pirat anti-tank guided missile programme, carried out by Mesko in cooperation with the Military University of Technology and the Ukrainian Luch Design Bureau. An agreement concerning development of the system for the Polish Armed Forces was concluded on 23 July 2014; in parallel, Mesko signed a cooperation agreement with the Luch Design Bureau. Mesko and the Luch Design Bureau were responsible for the missile design as a whole, while the autopilot was developed with participation from CRW Telesystem-Mesko. CRW was responsible for the optoelectronic systems and the seeker, on which it cooperated with Luch. The company itself describes the programme as being implemented by a consortium comprising Mesko, CRW and the Luch Design Bureau, and states that its engineers developed and implemented a guidance system based on an internally developed digital seeker with detectors.

Pirat uses a laser-homing seeker designed by CRW Telesystem-Mesko. The seeker detects laser radiation reflected from the designated target, while its tracking system seeks to minimise the angle between the optical axis of the coordinator and the missile–target line; the arrangement allows the use of proportional navigation.

The CLU-P (Command Launch Unit-Pirat) targeting and guidance unit, developed by CRW Telesystem-Mesko in cooperation with PCO S.A., is designed to operate with the Pirat missile, APR 155 and APR 120 precision-guided ammunition, and laser-guided aerial bombs. The upper guidance module of the CLU-P incorporates the LPD-A laser rangefinder-designator developed by CRW, while the lower observation and sighting module was designed by PCO S.A.

== Awards and distinctions ==
In 2026, CRW Telesystem-Mesko received the Orzeł Bezpieczeństwa ("Security Eagle") award in the "Innovative Technologies for Security" category for next-generation detection-system technologies for Piorun 2 and the modernisation of Piorun.
