= Pirat (missile) =

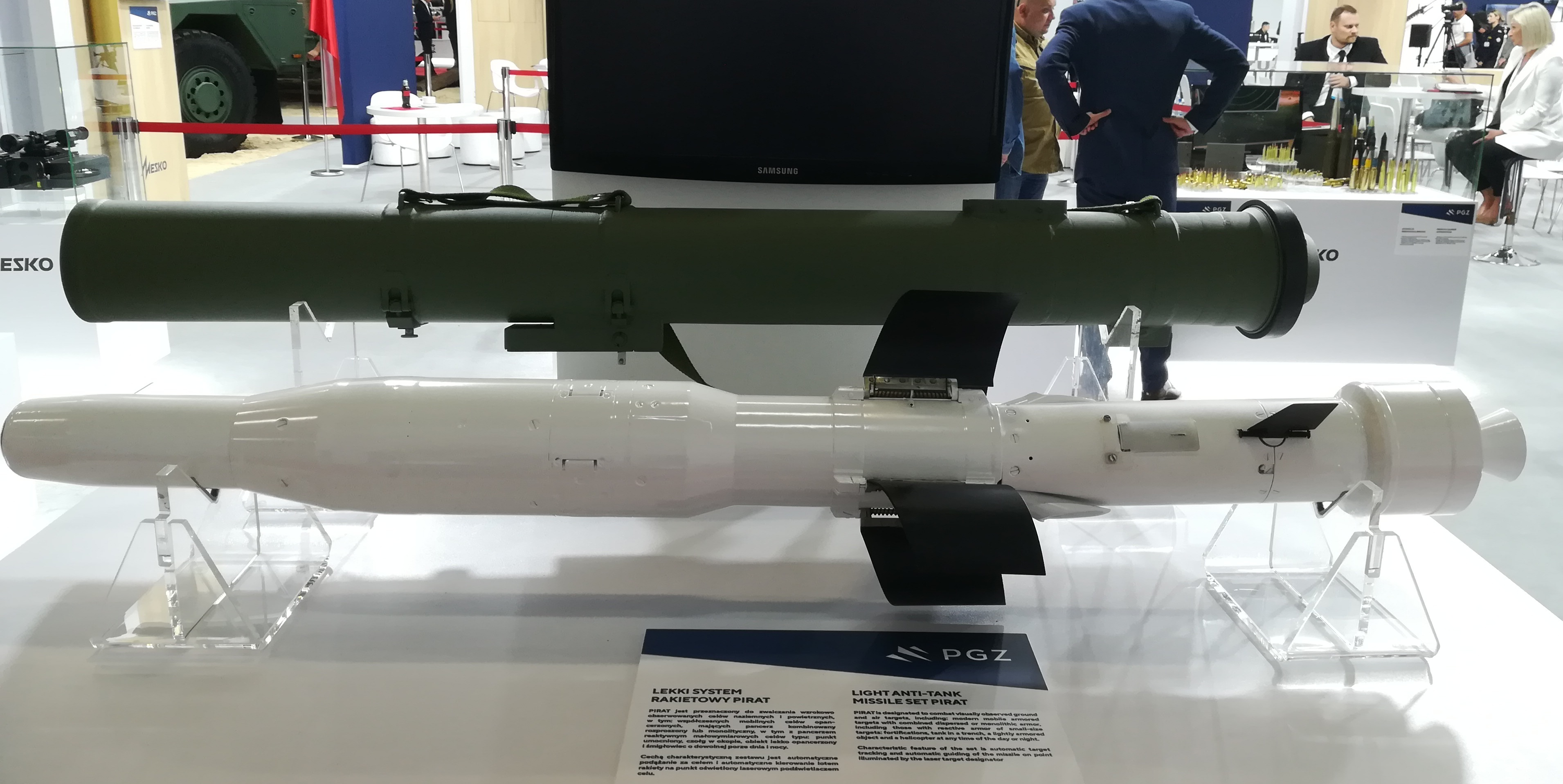
- Pirat ATGM at International Defence Industry Exhibition 2022 in Kielce, Poland.
- Type: Anti-tank missile
- Place of origin: Poland / Ukraine

Production history
- Designer: Mesko / Luch Design Bureau
- Designed: 2014–2020

Pirat is a Polish light anti-tank guided missile developed by Mesko. It is planned to enter the armament of the Polish Army and is derived from the design of the Ukrainian RK-3 Korsar missile.

== Development ==
The basis for the creation of the Pirat missile was worked on precision artillery ammunition that was self-guided to a laser-illuminated target. Undertaken in response to the requirements of the Polish Armed Forces by Mesko at the end of the first decade of the 21st century, this led to the construction of the APR 155 artillery missile. A cooperating laser target illuminator LPC-1 was also designed. Mastering the technology of laser-homing warheads also made it possible to design a light anti-tank missile guided by the same principle. Initially, it was assumed that such a missile would be based on the design of the Grom anti-aircraft missile. It was to use a new homing warhead and fuse, however, the remaining warhead of the anti-aircraft missile excluded fighting tanks, allowing only infantry fighting vehicles, lighter vehicles or fortifications. Ultimately, it was decided to use the cooperation established with the Ukrainian defense company Luch Design Bureau which relied on the design of the RK-3 Corsar anti-tank missile, which was guided by a different method – a remotely controlled in a laser guide beam. The Ukrainian missile was not to be Polonized, and only its components were to be the starting point for the Polish missile. This concept was presented in 2013 and met with interest from the military, which resulted in the Mesko being commissioned in 2014 from budget funds for development work for PLN 15 million for "the development and implementation of a lightweight system with a guided missile with a range of 2.5 km, codenamed Pirate". Mesko S.A.'s partners were CRW Telesystem-Mesko Sp. z o.o., KKB Łucz, Military University of Technology and PCO S.A. The Łucz Office was responsible for the general design of the missile as a carrier and the control unit, Telesystem-Mesko for the guidance head, optoelectronics and autopilot (in cooperation with KKB Łucz), and Mesko for the warhead with a fuse, the starting and marching engine and other components, including the launcher.

In 2016, tests of the guidance head were conducted using a modified Grom missile. In June 2017, the Pirat missile began its field tests in its target configuration, with modified components of the Corsar missile provided by the Ukrainian side. A total of 18 missiles have been fired during research and development of the design until 2019.

The missile launcher is shoulder-mounted or on a tripod. It is equipped with an observation-aiming-illuminating unit (CLU), containing a day camera, a thermal imaging camera and a laser illuminator-rangefinder LPD-A. The flight of the projectile is automatically controlled to the point illuminated by the laser target illuminator. The full-time staff is to consist of two soldiers: a gunner and an operator of the illuminator/ammunition. The operator or gunner's task is to keep the laser spot on the target until it hits. The gunner can illuminate the target using the launcher's CLU unit or by the operator of an external illuminator; in the latter case, the gunner can leave the position immediately after firing. It is possible to choose between two flight trajectories: flat or with a climb, when the missile rises to a height of 70–150 m and attacks the tank at a significant angle from above, hitting a less protected area. The warhead's penetration is to be equivalent to 550 mm of steel (RHA) behind reactive armour.

The Pirat is to be a lightweight system, positioned as an anti-tank defense system between the Spike-LR missiles and anti-tank grenade launchers. It is planned to be used by both operational forces and the Territorial Defense Forces. Due to the adopted design and guidance system, the advantage is the relatively low price of the missile, which is expected to be about one-third of the price of the American FGM-148 Javelin missile (also used by Territorial Defense Forces).

== See also ==
- FGM-148 Javelin
- Spike (missile)
- List of anti-tank missiles

== Bibliography ==
- Kiński, Andrzej (2020). "Pirat - szansa na realne wzmocnienie polskiej obrony przeciwpancernej". Wojsko i Technika. Warszawa. ISSN 2450-1301.
