= PSR-A Pilica =

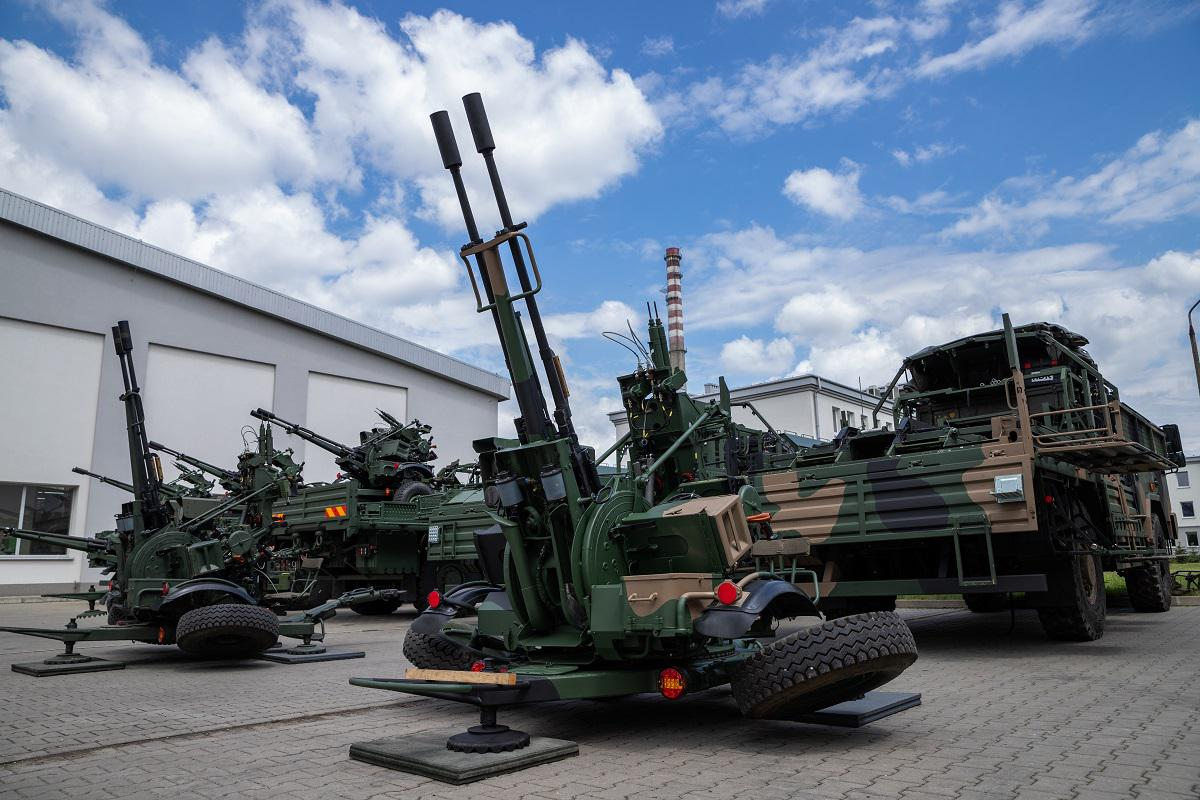
- Type: Anti-Aircraft System
- Place of origin: Poland

Service history
- In service: 2020 – present
- Used by: Polish Air Force

Production history
- Designed: 2015
- Manufacturer: Zakłady Mechaniczne Tarnów
- Produced: 2019 – present

Specifications (PSR-A Pilica)
- Main armament: 2 Grom or Piorun missiles in the special starting rail, twin barrel 23 mm autocanon
- Suspension: Jelcz 442.32 4 x 4
- Operational range: 6,500 m for Grom/Piorun missiles, 3,000m for 23 mm auto cannon

PSR-A Pilica is a Polish Very Short Range Air Defense (VSHORAD) anti-aircraft missile and artillery system.

== History ==
Work on the Pilica system began in 2006 at the Military University of Technology. In 2010–2013, they were co-financed by the National Centre for Research and Development and implemented by a consortium consisting of the Military University of Technology as the program leader, Zakłady Mechaniczne Tarnów and Bumar-Labedy. The contractor for Pilica is the PGZ-PILICA consortium, which consists of the following Polish Armaments Group (PGZ) companies: PIT-Radwar, PCO and Zakłady Mechaniczne Tarnów. In 2015, the in-house tests of the system were completed.

In November 2016, a contract worth PLN 746.16 million gross was signed for the delivery of six PSR-A Pilica systems. There are a total of 6 command posts, 36 fire units, 6 radar stations and 60 recovery vehicles, including 36 fire unit transport vehicles, 12 transport vehicles and 12 ammunition vehicles. In 2018, an annex to the contract was signed, directing the serial production system. In 2019–2020, training camps were conducted to check the operation of the entire system. In October 2020, PSR-A Pilica completed delivery and acceptance tests, opening the way for deliveries of the system to the Polish Armed Forces.

=== Service in Poland ===
In December 2020, the first prototype of the six ordered sets was handed over to the Polish Armed Forces, which was used by the 37th Air Defense Missile Squadron (3 BROP). The main task of the system is to cover air bases as a basic system, supplementing the fire zones of missile sets at low altitudes. In March 2022, the first serial Pilica set was commissioned.

Units equipped with the PSR-A Pilica system:

- 32nd Air Defense Missile Squadron (since 2022)
- 33rd Air Defense Missile Squadron
- 34th Air Defense Missile Squadron (since 2022)
- 35th Air Defense Missile Squadron (since 2022)
- 36th Air Defense Missile Squadron
- 37th Air Defense Missile Squadron (since 2020)

== Technical description ==
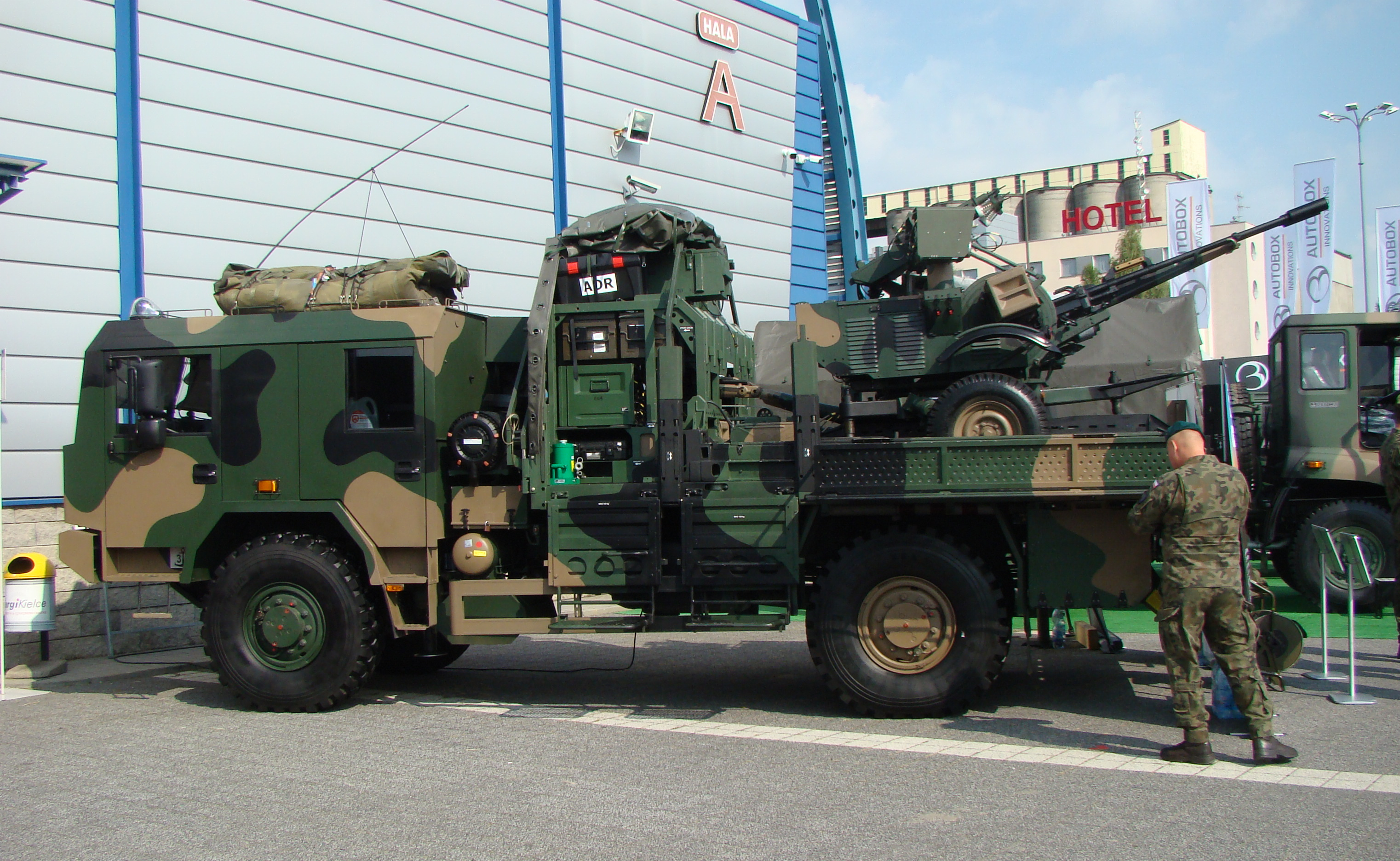
A single fire unit of the Pilica system on a Jelcz 442.32 transport vehicle

PSR-A Pilica is a very short-range anti-aircraft system (VSHORAD), the lowest layer of air defense to combat unmanned aerial vehicles, helicopters, airplanes and cruise missiles at a distance of up to 6500 m, and point protection of important areas or objects. The main armament of the Pilica system is the ZUR-23-2SP Jodek missile and artillery set consisting of a double anti-aircraft gun, with a theoretical rate of fire of 2,000 rounds/min and an effective fire range of up to 3 km. It is a Polish modification of the 23 mm ZU-23-2 gun, combined with two PPZR Grom or Piorun missile launchers, with a range of 6.5 km.

A single system (battery) consists of six fire units (JO), each of which consists of the ZUR-23-2SP Jodek missile and artillery set. Each fire unit has its own GOS-1 optoelectronic head, equipped with a thermal imaging camera, TV camera and a laser rangefinder, which enables independent operation in emergency mode. The KMW-1 Teja thermal imaging camera, manufactured by PCO, is used. The set includes a computerized command post (SD) on the Jelcz 442.32 truck chassis, three-coordinate radar (SR) SRL-97 based on the IAI ELM-2106NG ADSR-3D Tactical Air Defense Radar, manufactured by Israel Aerospace Industries, six artillery transport vehicles (CA) mounted on the Jelcz 442.32 truck chassis (one for each fire unit), two transport vehicles (PT) on the Jelcz 442.32 chassis and two ammunition vehicles (PA) built on the Jelcz 442.32 truck chassis. The fire unit can also fire from the transport vehicle platform.

Weapon control is fully automatic, using a computerized guidance system. It works in a semi-automatic system, targeting targets and destroying them after confirmation by the operator. The targeting system is integrated with the tracking system and the IFF system, which is able to block the weapon and stop firing when the target is identified by the IFF system as its own or allied aircraft. The pilica can be operated remotely. In the event of a power failure, it is possible to operate the fire effector in manual mode.

The set can fire both from the ground and an artillery tractor. The set is equipped with a stabilized optoelectronic head operating in the day-night mode, which can work independently of the weapon in terms of observation, detection and identification of targets. The head is an element of the guidance system, and a source of information for the entire system. Each set is equipped with a laser warning receiver.
