= Poprad (disambiguation) =

Poprad is a city in Slovakia. It may also refer to:

- Poprad (river)
- Poprad (self-propelled anti-aircraft missile system)
