= Tadeusz Szczurek =

Brigadier General Professor Tadeusz Szczurek

Rector-Commander of the Military University of Technology
- In office 2016–2020
- Preceded by: Zygmunt Mierczyk
- Succeeded by: Przemysław Wachulak

Personal details
- Born: October 28, 1960 (age 65) Częstochowa, Poland
- Education: Wyższa Szkoła Oficerska Wojsk Pancernych
- Awards: Order of Polonia Restituta (Poland)

Military service
- Allegiance: Poland
- Rank: Brigadier general

Tadeusz Szczurek (born 28 October 1960) is a Polish philosophy and security sciences specialist, Doctor of Philosophy, brigadier general of the Polish Armed Forces, associate professor and former rector-commander of the Military University of Technology in Warsaw, Poland.

He graduated from Wyższa Szkoła Oficerska Wojsk Pancernych in Poznań and Military University of Technology in Warsaw (master's degree). He also completed post-graduate studies at National Defence University of Warsaw (in pedagogy and crisis management). In 2001, he obtained a Doctor of Philosophy degree in humanities from the Faculty of Philosophy and Sociology of Maria Curie-Skłodowska University in Lublin. The title of his PhD thesis is: “Bioethical aspects of war.” In 2013, the National Security Faculty of National Defence University awarded him a habilitation in social sciences.

From 2005 to 2008, he served as the Chief of Logistics of the Ministry of National Defense of Poland. He was the Deputy Rector of Military University of Technology from 2008 to 2012 and then Deputy Rector for Military Affairs from 2012 to 2016. In 2016, he succeeded gen. dyw. Zygmunt Mierczyk as Rector-Commander of the university, a position he held until 2020, when he was succeeded by płk prof. dr hab. inż. Przemysław Wachulak.

In 2017, he was awarded the Order of Polonia Restituta. On 29 November 2018, he was promoted to the rank of brigadier general. On 28 November 2019, the President of Poland, Andrzej Duda, awarded him the title of professor. The ceremony for the granting of this title took place on 16 September 2020 at the Presidential Palace, Warsaw.
