= RK-3 Corsar =

Ukrainian anti-tank guided missile system

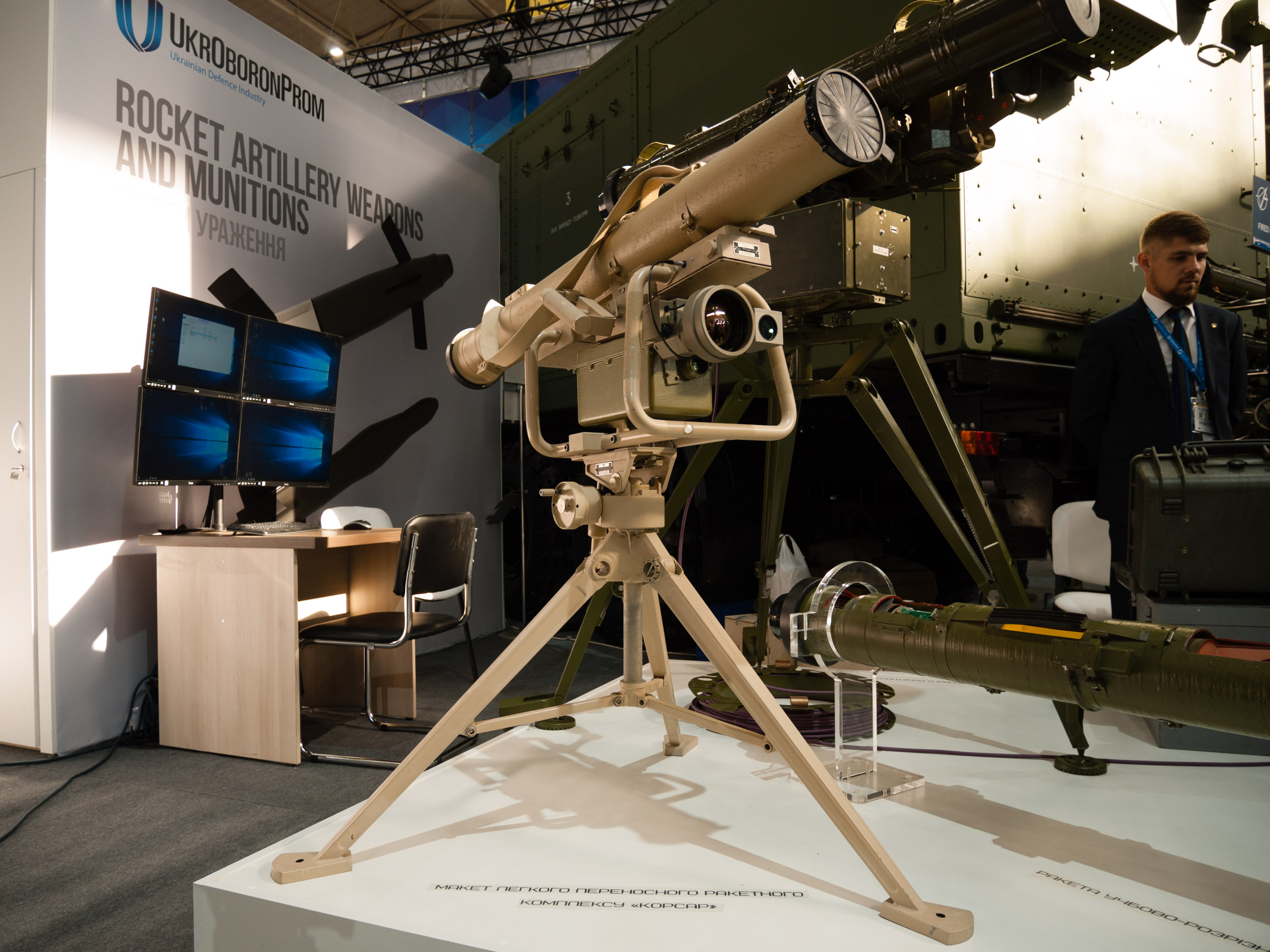
- Corsar ATGM with thermal camera by Izyum Machine Plant. 'Zbroya ta Bezpeka' military fair, Kyiv, Ukraine, 2019
- Type: ATGM
- Place of origin: Ukraine

Service history
- In service: 2017-present
- Wars: War in Donbas; Russian invasion of Ukraine

Production history
- Designer: "Luch" State Kyiv Design Bureau
- Designed: since 2005
- Unit cost: USD 20 000 (July 2013)

Specifications
- Mass: Total system: 35.8 kilograms (79 lb); Launcher w/ thermal imager: 12 kg (26 lb); Mount: 8.3 kg (18 lb); Missile in container: 15.5 kg (34 lb)
- Length: Missile: 1.16 metres (3.8 ft)
- Diameter: 107 mm
- Effective firing range: 2500 m
- Warhead: RK-3K:Tandem-charge HEAT; RK-3OF:HE-fragmentation
- Detonation mechanism: contact
- Engine: Solid-fuel rocket
- Guidance system: laser beam riding

The RK-3 Corsar (Ukrainian: РК-3 Корсар) is a Ukrainian portable anti-tank guided missile developed by Luch State Kyiv Design Bureau.

The Corsar is likely to replace Soviet era anti-tank systems such as the 9M113 Konkurs and 9K111 Fagot.

== Description ==
Corsar is a light portable anti tank missile system. It is intended to destroy stationary and moving armored targets. It can also be used against emplacements, light-armored objects and helicopters. Firing can be carried out from the mount as well as from a trench parapet. A method of guidance is laser beam riding. The system has two types of warheads. RK-3K Tandem-charge HEAT warhead with at least 550mm penetration behind ERA and RK-3OF high explosive-fragmentation warhead with at least 50mm penetration.

The RK-3K warhead might be able to counter the front armor of medium weight main battle tanks such as T-72A. The system also has HE-fragmentation RK-3OF warhead to attack Infantry positions and light armored vehicles. The system has a thermal imager for use in night time operation.

== Development ==
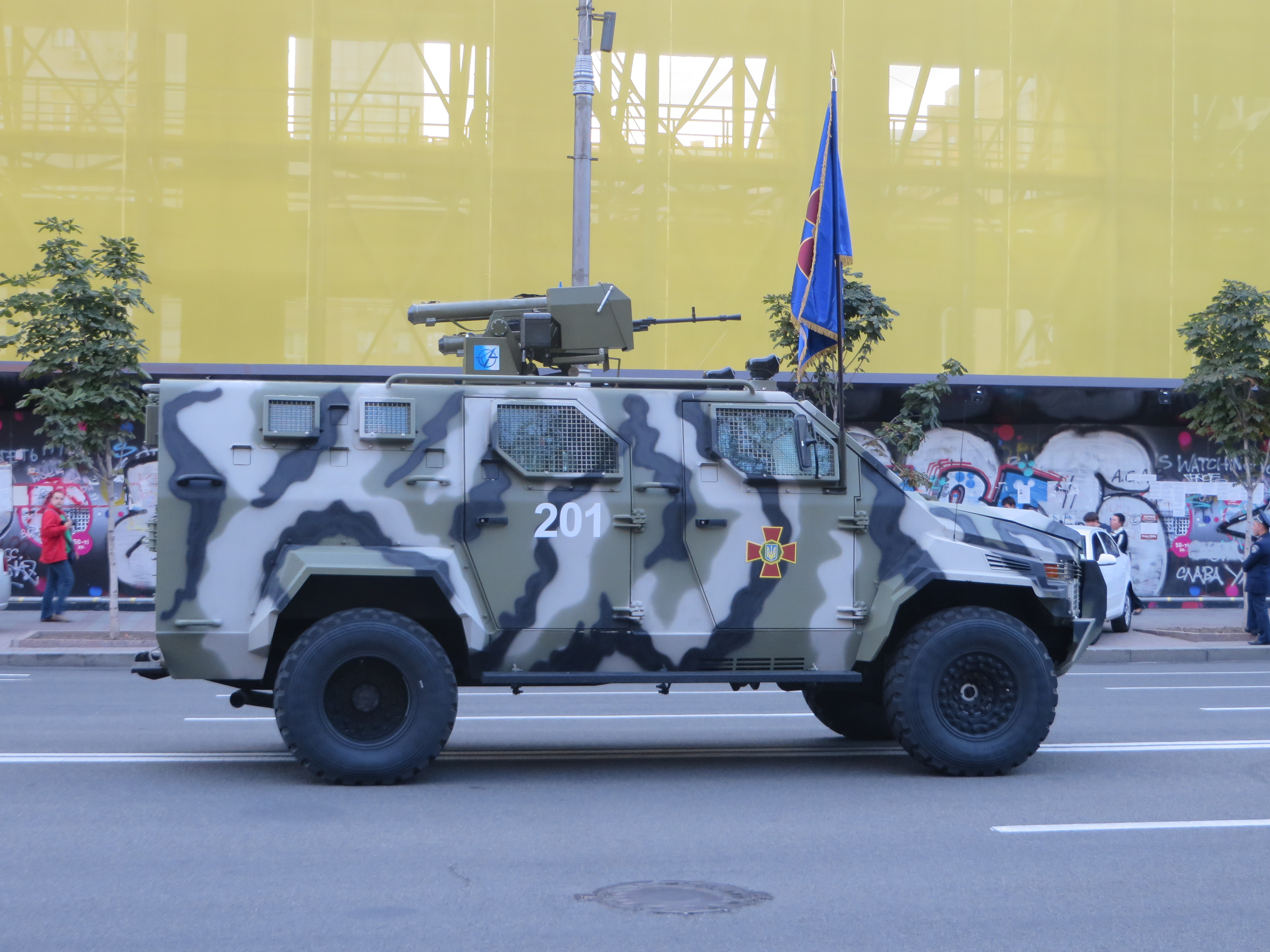
Ukrainian KrAZ Spartan with RK-3 Corsar ATGM installed, during a practice for the parade dedicated to the 23rd Independence Day of Ukraine (Kyiv, Ukraine)

Ukraine's state-owned defense contractor State Kyiv Design Bureau, Luch started the project in the early 2000s. A prototype was debuted during the 2005 IDEX arms show in Abu Dhabi.

On July 25, 2013 at a landfill near Kyiv, successful tests of the missile were conducted. During testing, the Corsar missile demonstrated the ability to fire both a guided and an unguided rocket using the same launcher.

On August 29, 2017, Ukroboronprom reported that the Corsar Lightweight Portable Missile System, which was developed by the Luch State Design Bureau, was adopted by the Ukrainian Ground Forces, according to the Ministry of Defense.

In November 2018, an updated version of the system with Greek-made thermal imaging camera added to the launcher was demonstrated.

The Corsar is being used for the creation of the Pirat anti-tank missile, developed in cooperation of Polish firms and Luch bureau, in which beam-riding guidance was replaced with semi-active laser homing.

== Operators ==
- Bangladesh: Border Guards Bangladesh
- Saudi Arabia: Saudi Arabian Army
- Ukraine: Armed Forces of Ukraine
- Morocco: Royal Moroccan Army

== See also ==
- Stugna-P, another Ukrainian ATGM
