= Piorun (missile) =

Polish man-portable air-defense system

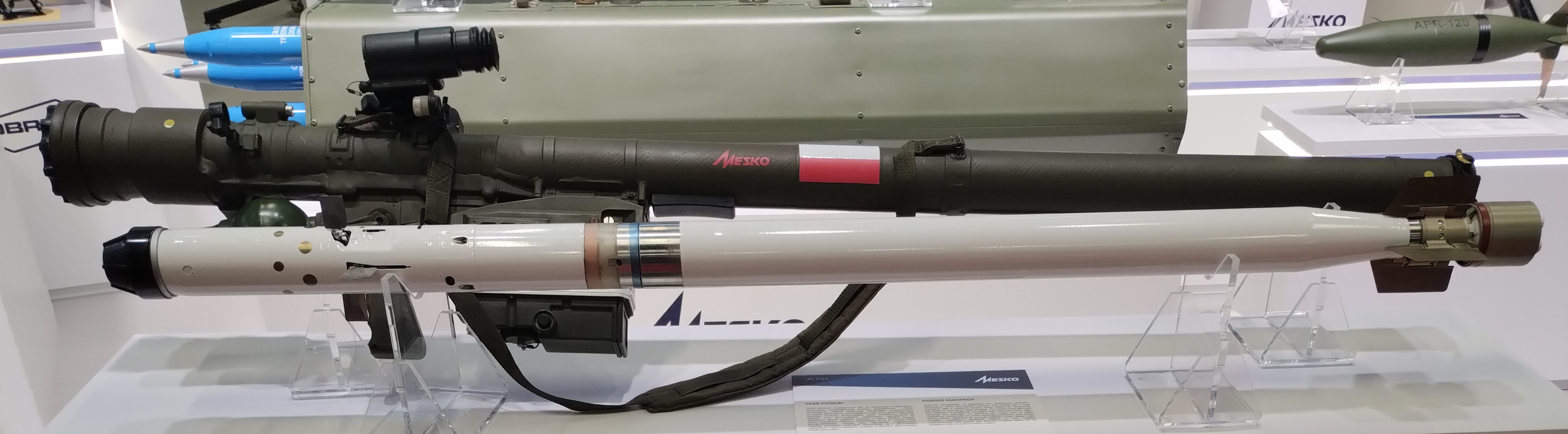
- PPZR Piorun missile with launcher
- Type: Man-portable air-defense system
- Place of origin: Poland

Service history
- In service: 2019–present
- Used by: See Operators
- Wars: Russian invasion of Ukraine

Production history
- Designed: 2010–2015
- Manufacturer: Mesko
- Unit cost: 1 mill. EUR/launcher+3 missiles
- Produced: 2016–present
- No. built: 3,000 (as of early 2025)

Specifications
- Mass: 16.5 kg (36 lb) total 10.5 kg (23 lb) missile
- Length: 1.596 m (5.24 ft)
- Diameter: 72 mm (2.8 in)
- Crew: 1
- Warhead: HMX with aluminium powder
- Warhead weight: 1.82 kg (4.0 lb)
- Detonation mechanism: impact fuze with a delay mechanism, and a proximity fuze for C-UAS
- Engine: Solid-fuel rocket motor
- Operational range: 400 m (1,300 ft)–6.5 km (4.0 mi)
- Flight ceiling: 4 km (13,000 ft)
- Flight altitude: 10 m (33 ft)–4,000 m (13,000 ft)
- Maximum speed: 660 m/s (Mach 2.0; 2,400 km/h; 1,500 mph)
- Guidance system: infrared homing with argon-cooled seeker
- Launch platform: MANPADS

Polish soldier with the PPZR Piorun during the Exercise Shield 2024.

The Piorun (Polish: "thunderbolt") is a Polish man-portable air-defense system, designed to destroy low-flying aircraft, airplanes, helicopters and unmanned aerial vehicles. The set is a deep modernization of the PPZR Grom set, with an alternative designation of Grom-M.

The full name of the system is PPZR Piorun (Polish: Przenośny Przeciwlotniczy Zestaw Rakietowy Piorun / English: Man-Portable Air-Defense Missile System).

== History ==
The Piorun Portable Anti-Aircraft Missile System is produced by the Mesko company and was created as a result of the GROM system modernization carried out in 2010–15. As part of the modernization, the effectiveness of the homing warhead was significantly improved by increasing the sensitivity of detection, which increased the distance at which the missile is able to target and hit the target, increased resistance to interference was obtained, a proximity fuze was used, an access authorization system and the set for fire was adapted for use in night conditions.

In 2016, the Ministry of National Defence signed a contract for the purchase of 420 launchers (launch mechanisms) and 1,300 rockets for the Armed Forces of the Republic of Poland, planned for 2017–2020 delivery. Due to delays caused by technical problems with the propulsion system, the delivery of rockets and launch devices began in 2019 after successful testing. In 2020, Piorun missiles were fired from Poprad self-propelled anti-aircraft missile systems. The missiles are used not only by Poprad, but also by anti-aircraft missile and artillery system PSR-A Pilica.

In 2022, Poland announced the rapid supply of Ukraine with Pioruns during the 2021–2022 prelude to the Russian invasion of Ukraine.

== Operational history ==
During the Russian invasion of Ukraine, the Armed Forces of Ukraine claimed that a number of Russian jet fighters (Su-34, Su-25) and helicopters (Mi-24, Ka-52) were shot down with Piorun missiles.

== Operators ==
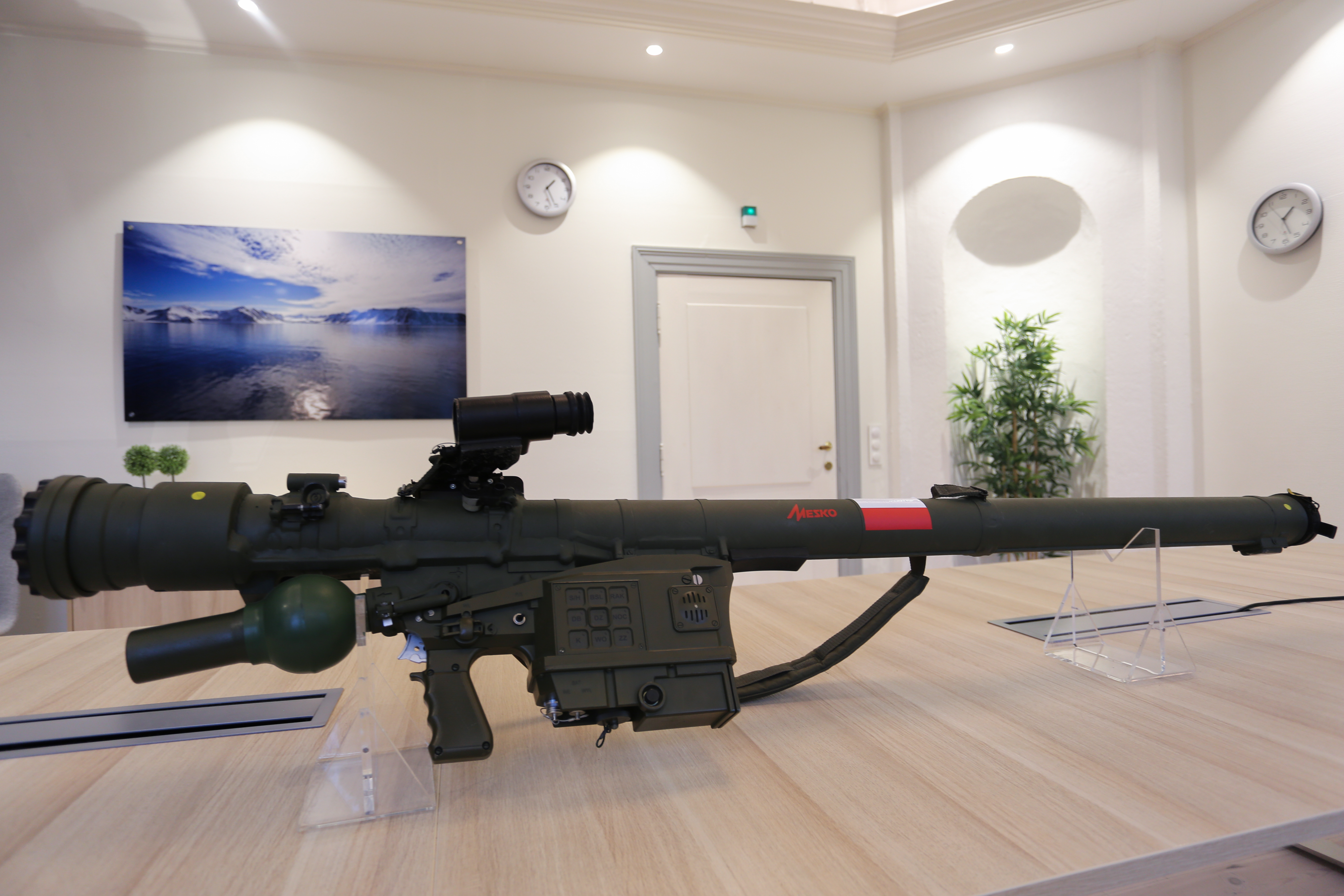
A Piorun model for the Norwegian army

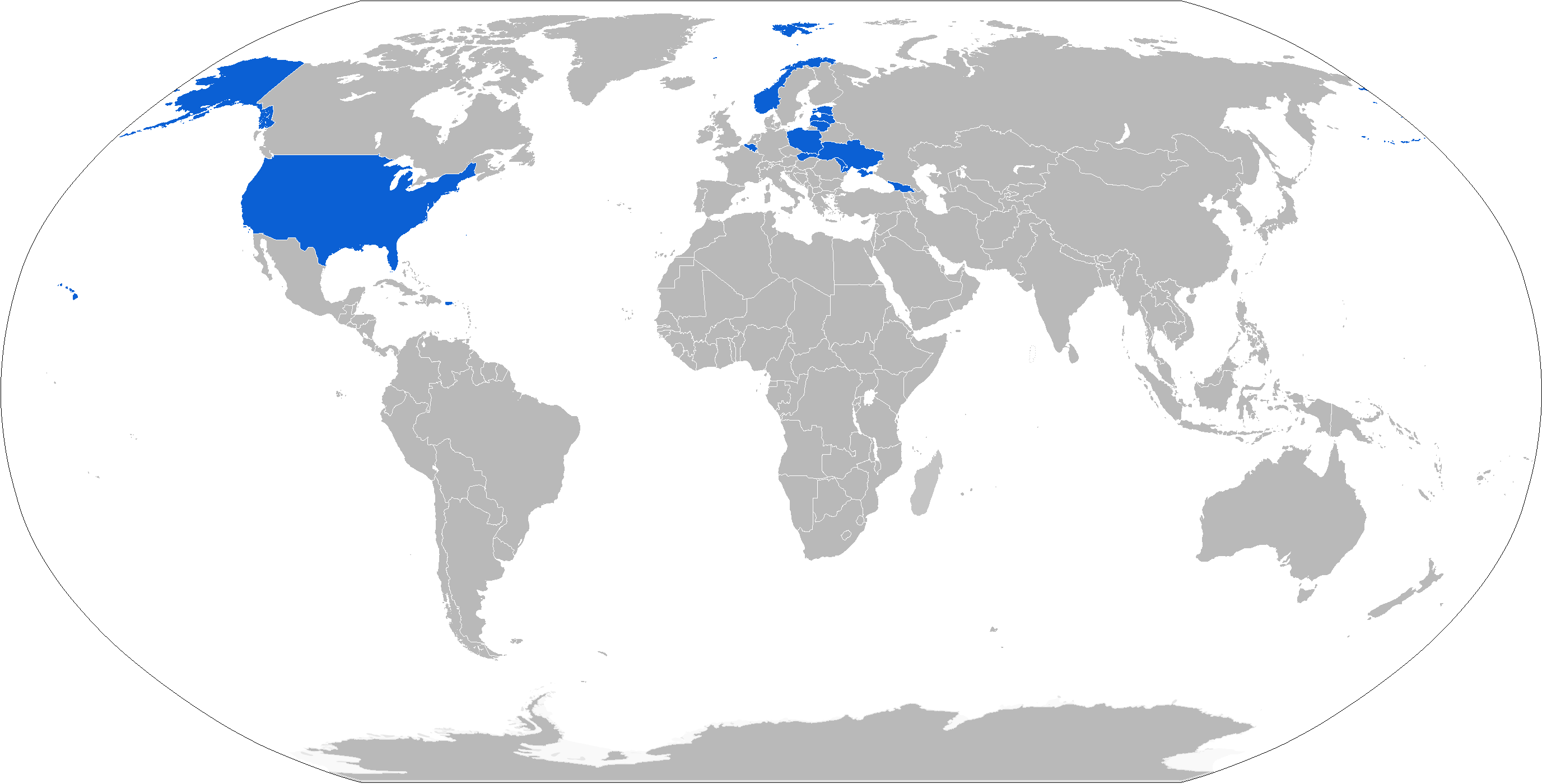
Map with Piorun users in blue

Belgium
Selected in May 2025.
Estonia
100 launchers with 300 missiles ordered in September 2022. Full operational capability is by 2024.
Georgia
Undisclosed number ordered in January 2024.
Latvia
Undisclosed number ordered by Latvia in 2023. 96 systems delivered in 2023 and 2024.
August 2026: common order with Poland, Norway and Lithuania under a framework agreement worth €1.86 billion, for an unknown quantity of missiles, deliveries by 2030.
Lithuania
The manufacturer disclosed that Piorun was exported to Lithuania in 2023 (although the country did not officially announce it).
August 2026: common order with Poland, Norway and Latvia under a framework agreement worth €1.86 billion, for an unknown quantity of missiles, deliveries by 2030.
Moldova
Undisclosed number of launchers and missiles. 44 units according to MESKO will be delivered in 2026.
Norway
Orders:
- November 2022: undisclosed number ordered.Units put into use on 15.08.2024 by the Finnmark Land Command, a volume of 50 systems was delivered in 2023 and 2024.
- August 2026: common order with Poland, Latvia and Lithuania under a framework agreement worth €1.86 billion, for an unknown quantity of missiles, deliveries by 2030. (150 systems for Norway)
Poland
At least 1,300 missiles were delivered. Another 3,500 missiles alongside 600 MANPAD launchers ordered.
August 2026: common order with Norway, Latvia and Lithuania under a framework agreement worth €1.86 billion, for an unknown quantity of missiles, deliveries by 2030.
Sweden
Undisclosed number ordered in September 2025 and delivered in December 2025.
Ukraine
Undisclosed number delivered in 2022.
United States
Undisclosed number ordered in 2022.

=== Future operators ===
Slovakia
36 launchers chosen in October 2023 for 65.8 million EUR. The contract has not been signed yet.

=== Potential operators ===
France
It expressed interest in purchasing Piorun launchers, most of which are to be delivered to the French armed forces and the rest to the Ukrainian armed forces.
Germany
Interest in purchasing the Piorun missile has been expressed. No details were provided on how many launchers and missiles would be purchased and which units would ultimately receive them.
Netherlands
The purchase of Piorun anti-aircraft systems is being announced.

== See also ==
- FIM-92 Stinger
