= Poprad (self-propelled anti-aircraft missile system) =

SPZR Poprad
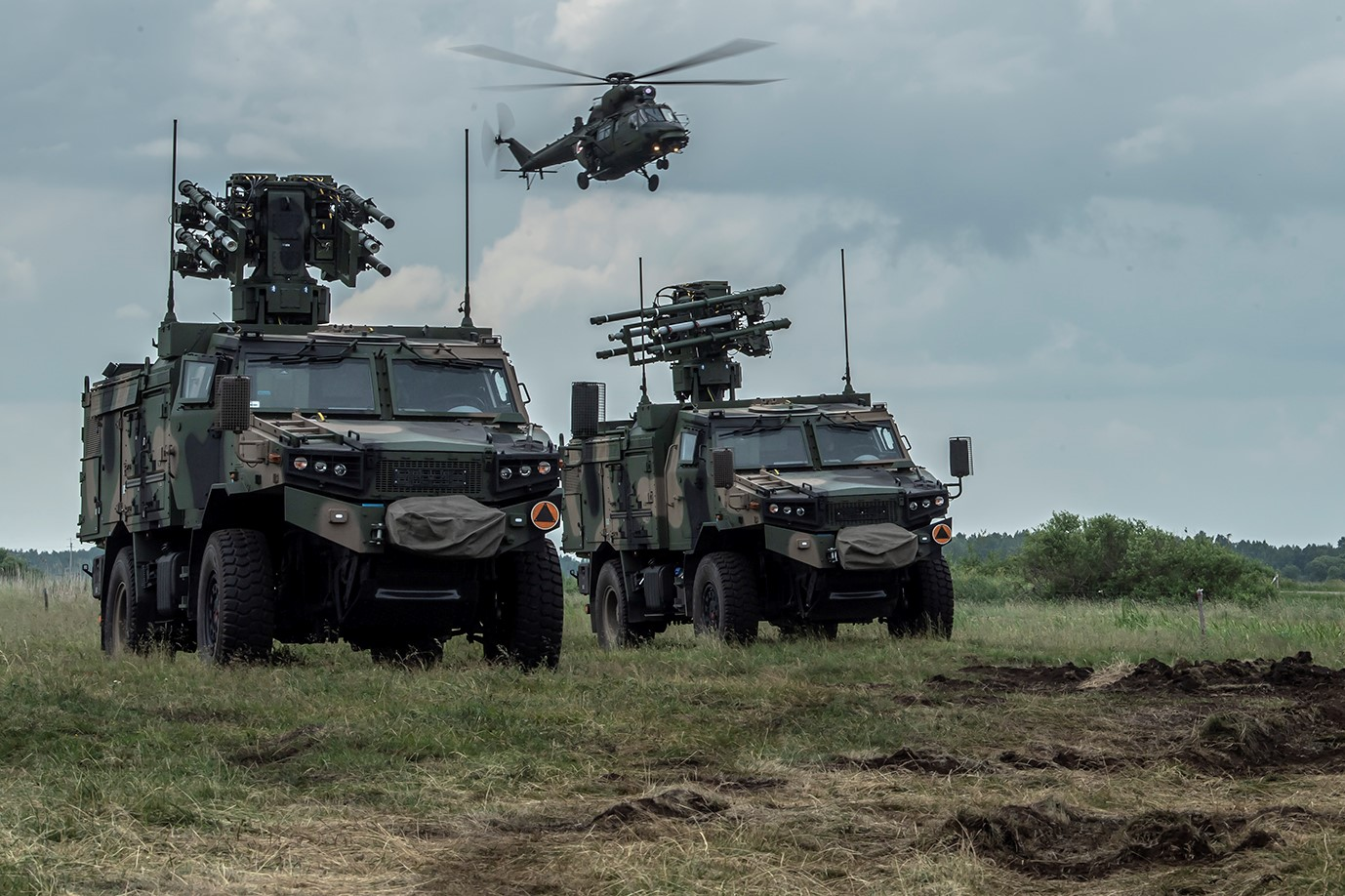
- Type: self-propelled Surface-to-air missile system
- Place of origin: Poland

Service history
- In service: 2018 – present
- Used by: Polish Land Forces; Indonesian Army

Production history
- Designed: 2005-2015
- Manufacturer: PIT-Radwar
- Produced: 2015-present
- No. built: 77/79

Specifications (SPZR Poprad)
- Length: 6.95 m (22 ft 10 in)
- Width: 2.45 m (8 ft 0 in)
- Height: 2.65 m (8 ft 8 in) in transport position
- Crew: 2
- Armour: steel
- Main armament: 4 Grom or Piorun missiles in the tracking head, 4 missiles in storage
- Engine: Iveco Tector NEF N60 ENT C 202 kW (275 HP)
- Suspension: 4 × 4
- Operational range: 550 km

The SPZR Poprad (pol. Samobieżny Przeciwlotniczy Zestaw Rakietowy) is a very short range air defense (VSHORAD) self-propelled anti-aircraft missile system, produced by PIT-Radwar S.A. It is named after the Poprad river.

== Description ==
The basic functions of the SPZR Poprad are realized by an integrated tracking and targeting head with highly dynamic and accurate drives. A set of electro-optics sensors (thermal imaging camera, daylight camera and laser rangefinder) works with the automatic target tracking system. The indication of targets is carried out via data transmitted via a digital channel from the automated air defense control system or is carried out autonomously. The kit includes a fire control computer, a navigation system and an IFF system. SPZR Poprad has been equipped with an inertial and satellite navigation system, thanks to which, after taking a fire position, the operator can immediately transfer the position of the set and the readiness status to the command system. The set is mounted as standard on the AMZ Żubr-P chassis produced by AMZ-Kutno. The design of the Poprad set minimizes the time needed to move from the transport position, in which the warhead is lowered and covered with roof covers, to the combat position.

The Poprad set can operate as part of the classic air defense system or independently. If the set operates in the anti-aircraft defense control system (it has communication with it), it receives the indicated targets and the command to open fire from there. Information about the radiolocation situation is transmitted to the Poprad system thanks to the VHF radio station or via wire communication. SPZR Poprad uses ZDPSR "Soła" radar stations, which indicate targets for the Poprad set batteries.

== System application ==
The Poprad self-propelled anti-aircraft missile system is designed to detect, recognize and destroy air targets at close ranges and low altitudes using short-range homing missiles. The set can be used to protect columns of troops, parking places, command posts and groupings, as well as airports, ports, industrial plants, communication junctions, etc. against air strikes.

== Users ==
According to the contract for the supply of Poprad anti-aircraft systems signed in December 2015, by 2021 the Polish Army is to receive a total of 79 of these sets, including 77 newly manufactured and 2 adapted from the implementation batch). Their deliveries started in 2018.

Apart from Poland, Poprad launchers were bought by Indonesian Army, as a part of export VSHORAD system Kobra, consisting of four Poprad launchers, two command vehicles, mobile MMSR radar and twelve towed AA guns with Grom launchers ZUR-23-2KG-I. All components are mounted upon lengthened 6×6 Land Rover Defender chassis (Polish modification Huzar). The system was delivered in 2007 and was designated locally as Aster (not to confuse with Aster missiles). In 2006 Indonesia ordered the second such system, delivered in 2010.
