= PZR Grom =

Polish man-portable air-defense system

Grom
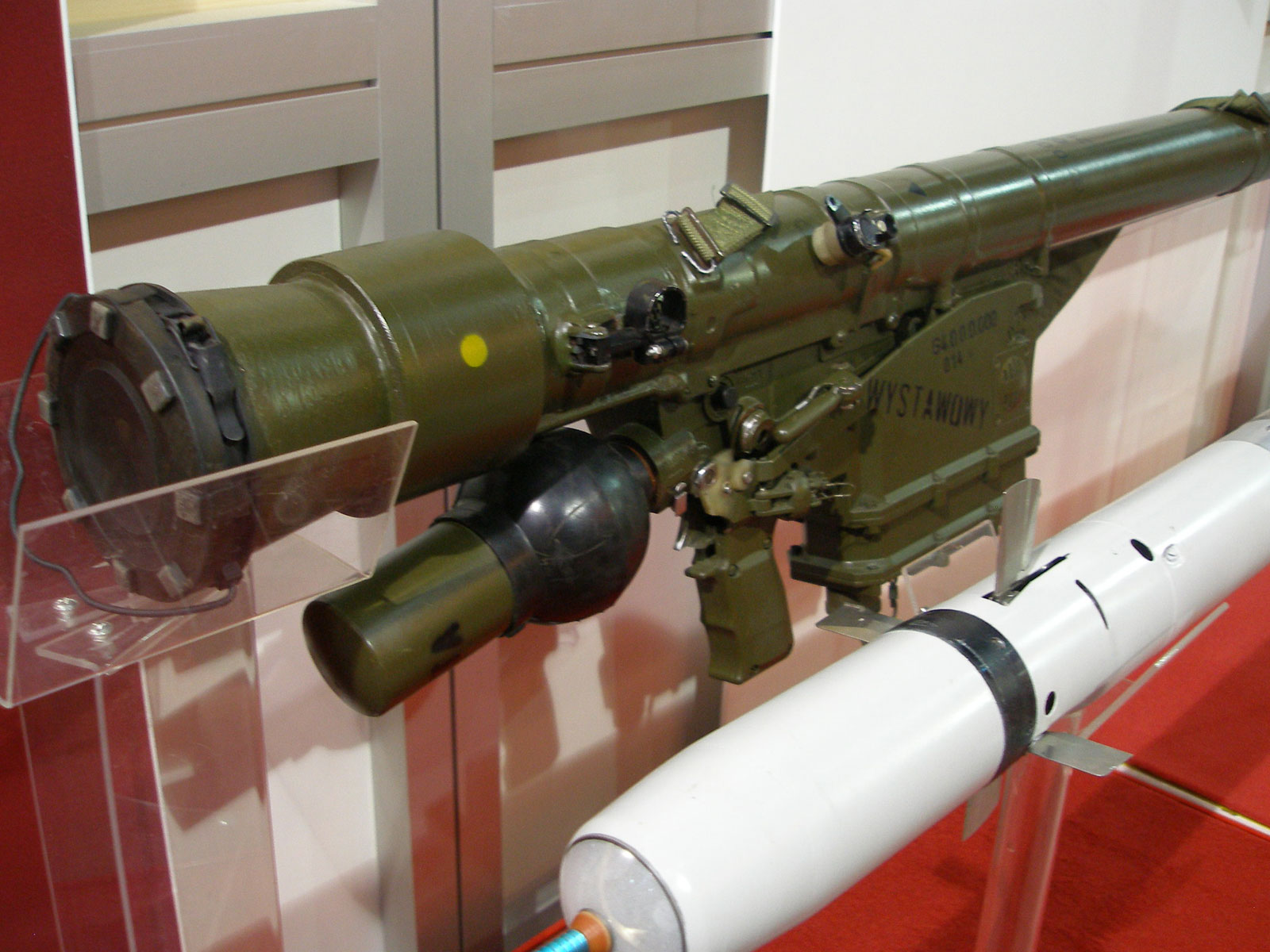
- Grom missile with launcher
- Type: Man-portable air-defense system
- Place of origin: Poland

Service history
- In service: 1995–present
- Used by: See Operators
- Wars: Second Chechen War; Russo-Georgian War; War in Donbas

Production history
- Designer: Military Institute of Armament Technology, WAT Military University of Technology, Skarżysko Rocket Design Bureau
- Manufacturer: Mesko, Skarżysko-Kamienna
- Produced: 1995–present

Specifications
- Mass: 16.5 kilograms (36 lb), and for missile only 10.5 kilograms (23 lb)
- Diameter: 72 millimetres (2.8 in)
- Warhead weight: 1.27 kilograms (2.8 lb)
- Detonation mechanism: contact
- Engine: solid fuel rocket
- Operational range: 5.5 kilometres (3.4 mi)
- Flight altitude: 3.5 kilometres (11,000 ft)
- Maximum speed: 650 metres per second (2,100 ft/s)
- Guidance system: infrared
- Launch platform: MANPADS

PZR Grom (Grom, meaning "thunder" in Polish) is a man-portable air-defense system produced in Poland and based on the Soviet man-portable infrared homing surface-to-air missile (SAM) 9K38 Igla. It consists of a 72 mm anti-aircraft missile set with a flight speed of 650 m/s, as well as a single-use launcher, re-usable gripstock and thermal battery coolant assembly electric unit. The full name of the system is Przeciwlotniczy Zestaw Rakietowy Grom (lit. 'anti-air rocket-propelled set').

It is designed to target low-flying helicopters and aeroplanes. As such, the Grom missile is used by other surface-to-air defence systems manufactured in Poland, including ZSU-23-4MP Biała, ZUR-23-2 kg and Poprad self-propelled artillery system. It should not be confused with versions of the Zvezda Kh-23 air-to-surface missile built under licence in Yugoslavia/Serbia as the Grom-A and Grom-B.

== History ==
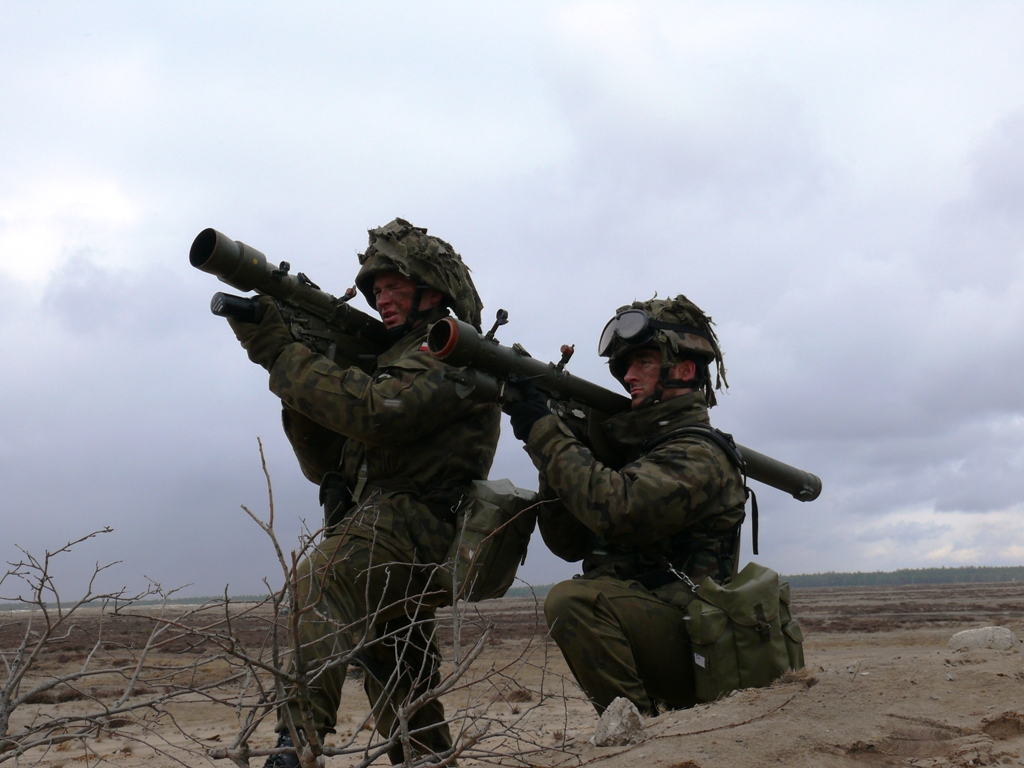
Polish soldiers practice aiming with Grom MANPADs

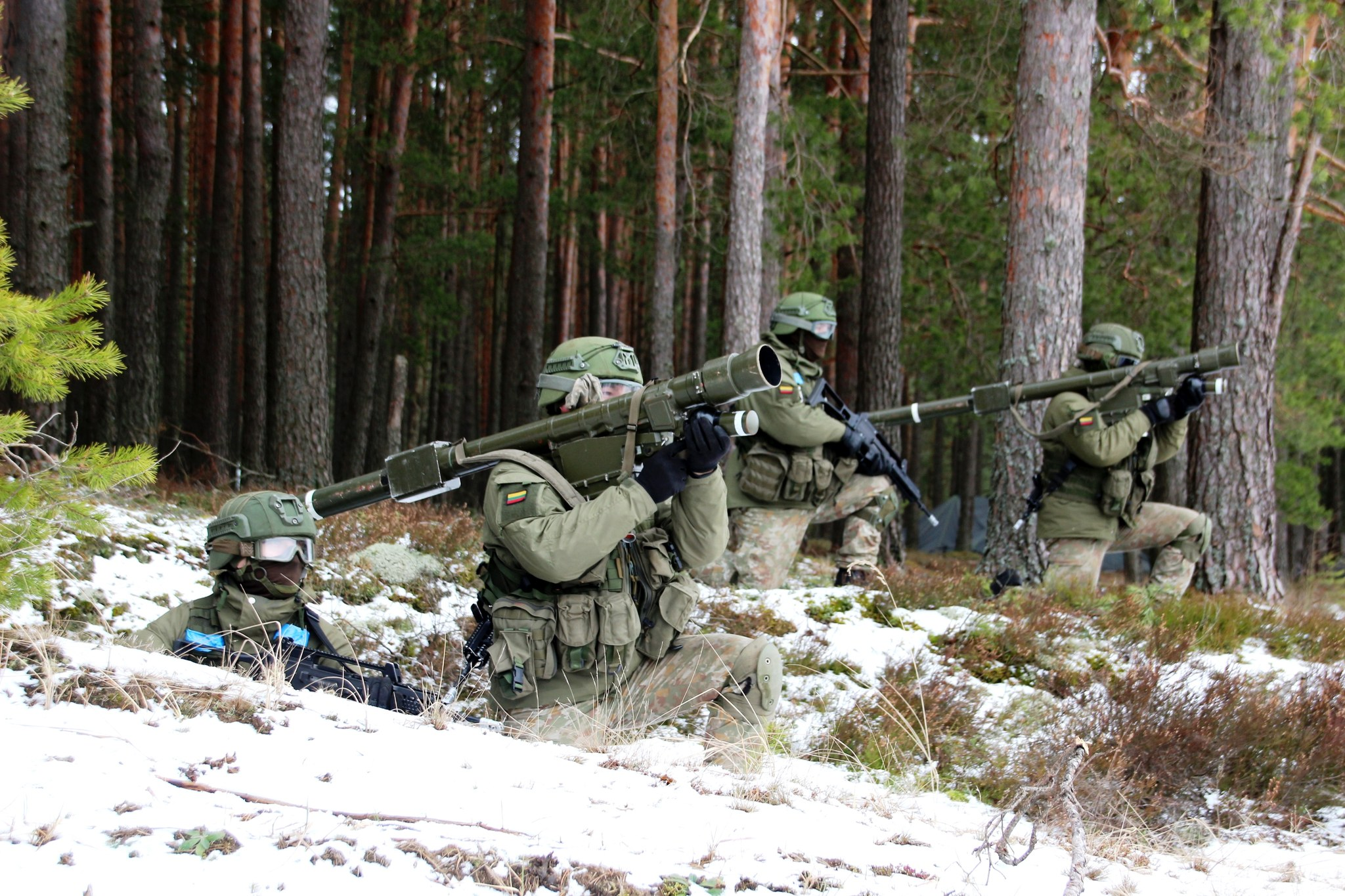
Lithuanian soldiers train with Grom

Initially at least since the 1970s the MESKO metal works in Skarżysko-Kamienna mass-produced license-built Soviet Strela-2M (SA-7 Grail) surface-to-air missiles, designated in Poland as Strzała-2M. However, when these became outdated in the late 1980s the lead designers prepared the works to produce a more modern Soviet design, the 9K38 Igla (SA-18 Grouse). However, Poland left the Soviet bloc in 1990 and the license was declined, thus leaving Poland with no modern MANPADS at hand.

Because of that, in late 1992 various Polish works and design bureaus (among them the Zielonka-based Military Institute of Armament Technology, the WAT Military University of Technology and the Skarżysko Rocket Design Bureau) started working on a new Igla-like design. These were allegedly helped by the Polish intelligence services able to buy the design plans of the original 9K38 Igla missile system in the LOMO works in Leningrad (modern St. Petersburg) during the turmoil following the dissolution of the Soviet Union. By 1995 the first batch (marked as GROM-1) entered service. It included a number of imported Russian components. By the late 1990s these were replaced with entirely Poland-designed elements.

On January 1, 2013, Bumar Amunicja manufactured their 2,000th Grom missile set.

Grom was later improved into what became known as the Piorun, with a new seeker and rocket motor.

== Design ==
The system is designed to be operated by one soldier. It consists of a single-stage projectile, a single-use tubular launcher, a starting mechanism, and an on-ground power supply. The rocket projectile uses solid propellant. The infrared aiming sensor is cooled with liquid nitrogen. There are options for identification friend or foe and thermovision.

== Operational history ==
The 'Grom' has been used by Polish Land Forces since 1995. It is also exported to other countries, including Georgia which bought 30 launchers and 100 missiles in 2007. According to press releases during the Russo-Georgian War, Polish-made GROM missiles targeted Russian planes and helicopters 20 times, 12 missiles were fired out of which 9 hit their targets, and most likely shot down a Su-25.

The Indonesian Army bought around 152 Grom missiles as part of Kobra (Aster) V-SHORAD system, including four Poprad mobile launchers, 12 ZUR-23-2 kg-I launchers and 76 missiles delivered in 2007 and the second such system ordered in 2006.

In March 2012, Peru chose the winners of a $140 million competition meant to upgrade its air defence systems, choosing among others 50 Grom launchers and six Poprad mobile launchers. However, there have been no reports of the deal being finalized.

== Political relevance ==
In late 2008, the Russian press made claims that Russian Army personnel had discovered Polish GROM missiles in Chechnya. In response, the Polish press quickly reacted and accused Russia of fabricating evidence to falsely link Poland to the conflict. The Polish press claimed that the missiles had actually been moved by Russians from Georgia to Chechnya.

== Operators ==
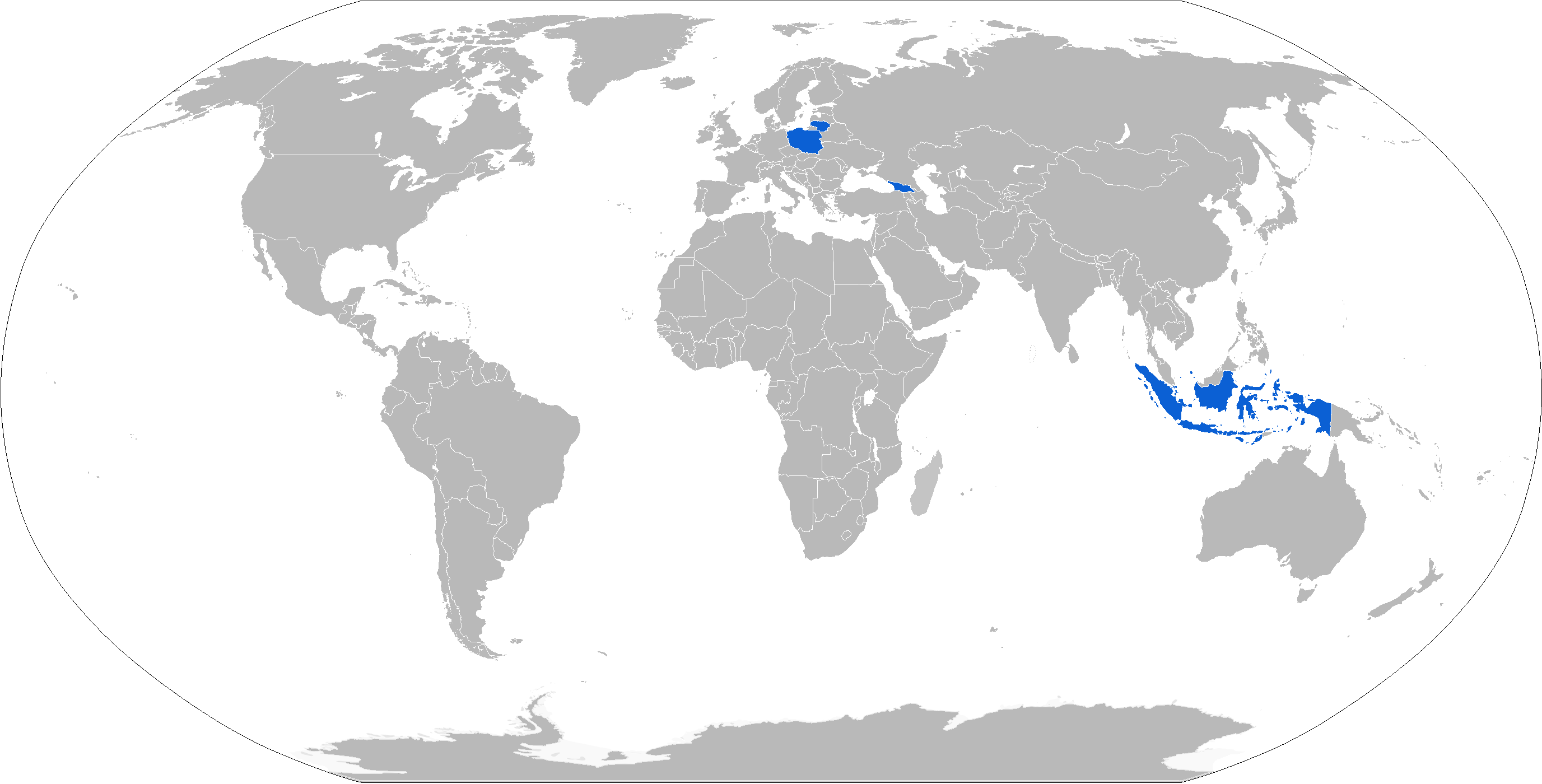
Map with Grom operators in blue

=== Current operators ===
- Georgia – 30 launchers and 100+ missiles, were used in Russo-Georgian war.
- Indonesia – In use as a part of Aster system.
- Lithuania – 18 launchers bought in 2014, in 2023 another batch worth around $20 million was bought.
- Poland – Around 400 launchers and 2000 missiles of Grom version, 400 missiles of Piorun version, 420 launchers and 1300 missiles of Piorun version on order.

=== Evaluation only ===
- Japan – One launcher and five missiles, bought in 2010 for testing.
- Russia – Captured unknown quantity of launchers in Georgia (One launcher was sent to the separatists in Ukraine).
- United States – purchased 120 missiles.

== See also ==
- Anza (missile) – (Pakistan)
- Misagh-2 – (Iran)
- Qaem – (Iran)
- FIM-92 Stinger – (United States)
- Mistral – (France)
- Sungur – (Turkey)
- Starstreak – (United Kingdom)
- 9K38 Igla – (Soviet Union)
- RBS 70 – (Sweden)
- QW-3 – (China)
