= Mesko =

Polish defense company

MESKO S.A.
- Native name: MESKO Spółka Akcyjna
- Type: joint-stock company
- Industry: arms industry (also home appliances and agriculture)
- Founded: 1922 in Skarżysko-Kamienna, Poland
- Headquarters: Skarżysko-Kamienna, Poland
- Area served: Worldwide
- Key people: Elżbieta Śreniawska (CEO)
- Products: Piorun, Grom, SPIKE-LR, NLPR-70, small arms ammunition
- Brands: MESKO, MESKO-AGD, MESKO-ROL
- Website: mesko.com.pl

MESKO is a Polish defense technology company established in 1922, operating from August 25, 1924 as Państwowa Fabryka Amunicji (National Ammunition Factory), then Zakłady Metalowe MESKO SA (Metal Factory MESKO SA). At present the company produces various munitions with headquarters in Skarżysko-Kamienna, Poland.

In the past, the factory was a manufacturer of home appliances, as in the communist period it belonged to the "Predom" union of industries. Currently part of the Polish Armaments Group (Polska Grupa Zbrojeniowa) concern, previously to the Bumar group.

== Current products ==
- Grom – Man-Portable Air Defense System (MANPADS)
- Piorun – MANPADS
- SPIKE-LR – Anti-Tank Guided Missile (ATGM)
- NLPR-70 – Unguided rocket for use for air-to-ground purposes
- Various small arms ammunition
- Pirat – ATGM
- Moskit – ATGM (under development)
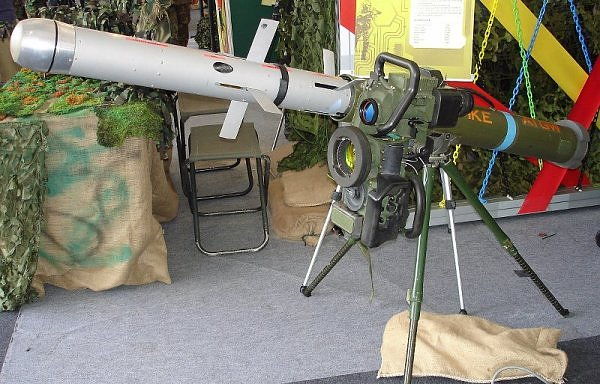
Spike LR ATGM

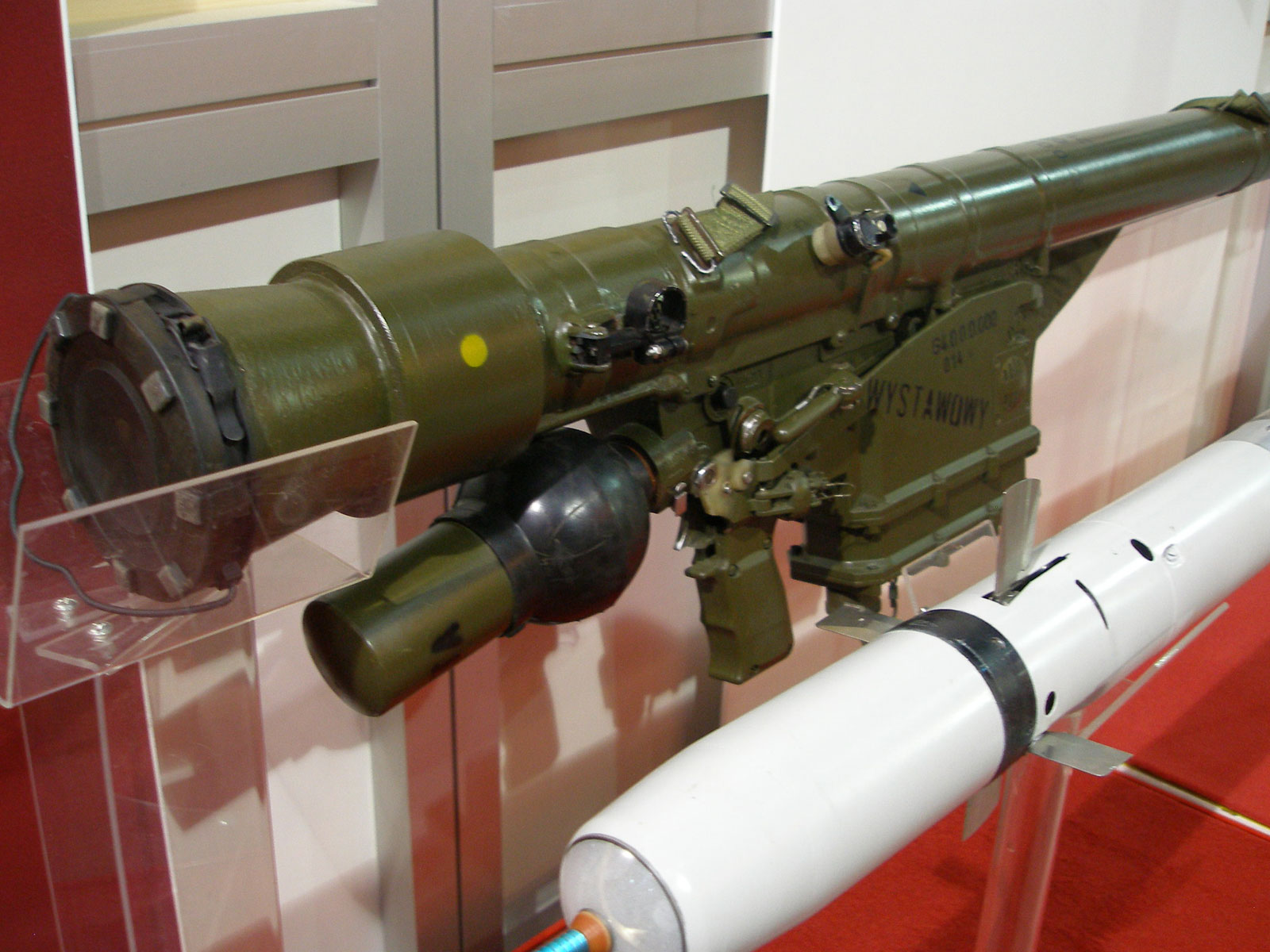
Grom MANPADS

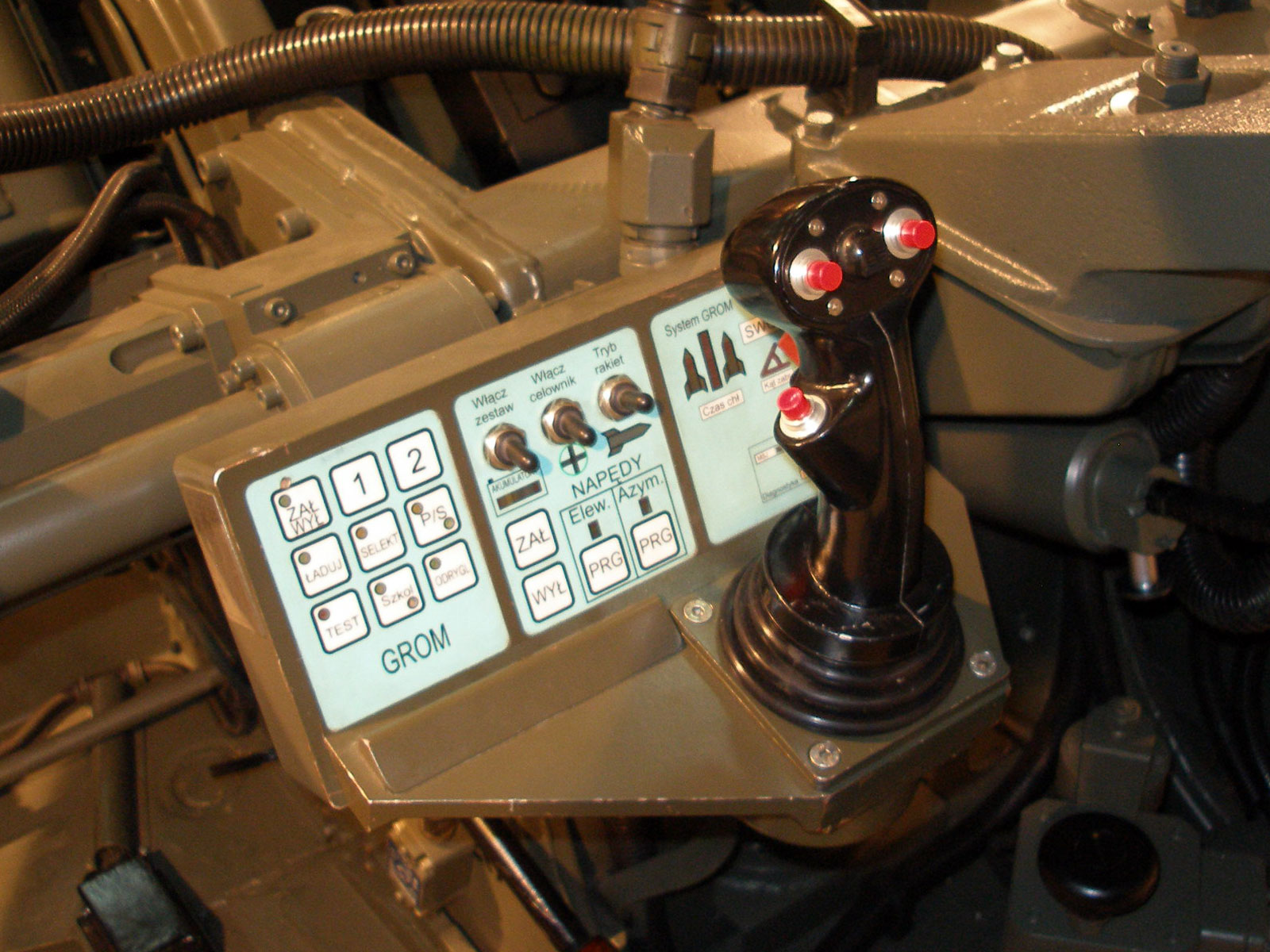
Grom control panel
