= Luch Design Bureau =

Ukrainian defense industry developer

Coordinates: 50°27′49″N 30°28′57″E

State Kyiv Design Bureau Luch
- Type: State enterprise
- Industry: Defense industry
- Founded: 1965
- Headquarters: 2, vul. Yuriya Illyenka, Kyiv, Ukraine
- Area served: Worldwide
- Key people: Oleh Korostelyov (as a General Director)
- Products: Missiles, Rocket engines, Electronics
- Parent: Ukroboronprom
- Website: luch.kiev.ua

Luch Design Bureau (Ukrainian: Державне Київське конструкторське бюро «Луч»), located in Kyiv, Ukraine, is a major Ukrainian developer of components for the defense industry.

The company is in close co-operation with the Artem holding company, also located in Kyiv. Artem is the main manufacturer of the models developed by the Luch Design Bureau.

The company was first established in Ukraine in 1965 and quickly became a leading Soviet developer of automated control systems and diagnostics systems in aviation engineering.

== History ==
1965 – development and release for production of PPP-3SM mobile position of preliminary preparation for application (with its location on UAZ car chassis) with air-to-air missiles manual control and PPP-3SAM mobile position of preliminary preparation for application with missiles automatic control system as a basis for creation of further missile automatic control systems for the Air and Navy Forces.

1965–1969 – creation and release for production of SAK-46 automatic control system for control of air missiles and automatic control and AKIPS-80 test mobile station for control of anti-submarine missiles. In the Soviet Union, the mentioned developments were recognized as a first automatic control systems by the State Commissions.

1968–1972 – development and release for production of “Ingul” system (with its location on GAZ-66 car chassis) for preparation for application and maintenance of 9 types of air missiles.

1968–1977 – development and release for production of automatic test and control mobile stations:

- AKIPS-125 for underwater missiles control;
- AKIPS-4U for anti-submarine missiles control;
- AKIPS-4U1 for torpedoes control.

1969–1977 – development and release for production of “Trubezh” system for preparation for application and maintenance of 12 types of air missiles.

1975–1977 – creation of current information aircraft recorder - RIU.

1977–1980 – development and release for production of “Ingul-A” and “Trubezh-A” systems with use of modularity (container) equipment construction for preparation for application and control of 26 types of missiles and guided air bombs (“Ingul-A”) and 18 types of missiles (“Trubezh-A”).

1978–1989 – development and release for production of automatic control and test mobile stations AKIPS-1 and AKIPS-3.2 for control of air anti-submarine missiles.

All mentioned stations were put into service by the Armed Forces of the Soviet Union and a number of foreign countries.

1981–1983 – development and release for production of multipurpose modular “Gurt” system which provides the preparation for application of more than 40 types of missiles and their various modifications. The “Gurt” system replaced “Ingul” and “Trubezh” systems that were in service.

In addition to new equipment samples development SKDB “Luch” is actively engaged in modernization and overhaul-period renewal of existing equipment.

By the respective coordinated decisions of the ministries of Ukraine the SKDB “Luch” was assigned as a Principal enterprise of Ukraine that conducts and coordinate works on specified life cycle and lifetime prolongation of air, anti-aircraft missiles, mine and torpedo weapon, the “Ingul” and "Gurt" systems as well as AKIPS stations.

Since 1979 SKDB “Luch” has been developing and producing units of servo electric control surface actuators of control systems of air, anti-aircraft missiles and torpedoes. More than ten steering modules with electric actuators were developed for products of various classes.

Thus, for example, in 1986 the block of servo electric control surface actuators for R-77 air-to-air missile with lattice control surfaces was created. On the basis of the compact commutatorless electric motors created in Ukraine for the previous decade the SKDB “Luch” developed and has been producing a number of small-sized units of servo electric control surface actuators for the guided tank missiles. Actuators are a part of developed and produced by the SKDB “Luch” digital control systems which provide rounds and missiles precise guidance. Actuators provide high accuracy characteristics, have increased jamming resistance and withstand overloads which take place during firing from guns.

Since 2002 the SKDB “Luch” has been supplying (instead of the “Gurt” system) the “Gurt-M” system which provides:

- control and preparation for application of more than 50 various modifications of air missiles and guided air bombs;
- final checking of missiles at manufacturing plants;
- fault diagnostic during missiles repair;
- missiles technical state forecast during overhaul-period renewal.

More recently the SKDB “Luch” has been a Principal enterprise that develops conceptually new special military equipment for Ukraine with participation of over than 30 Ukrainian enterprises. Products developed under this program are included in the top-priority category.

In 2021, the company presented designs for two air-to-air missiles: the medium-range UP-277 with an active radar homing head and a highly maneuverable advanced short-range air-to-air missile with an infrared homing head. This missile is a more modern analog of the Soviet R-77 missile.

== Products ==
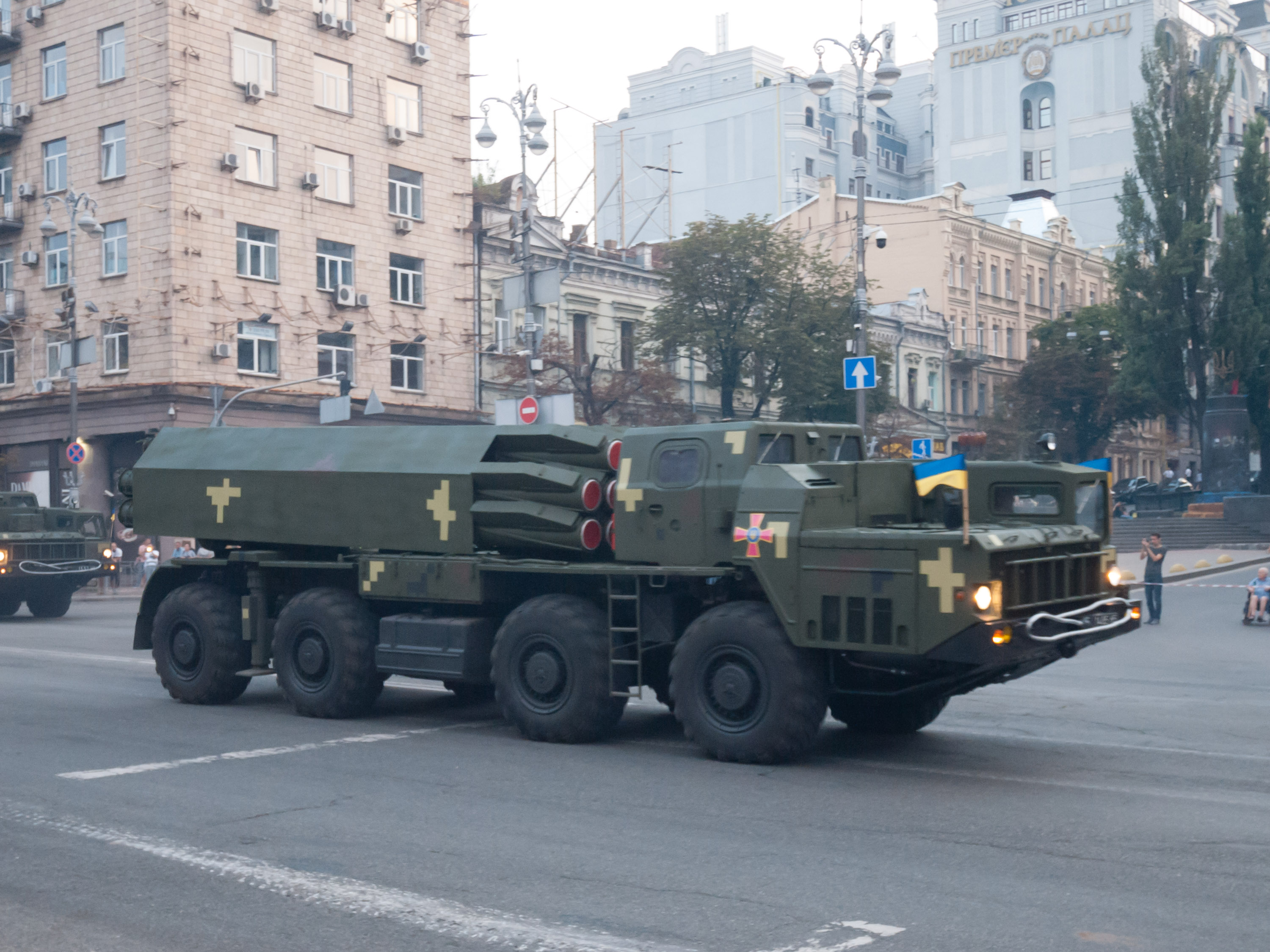
Vilkha MLRS

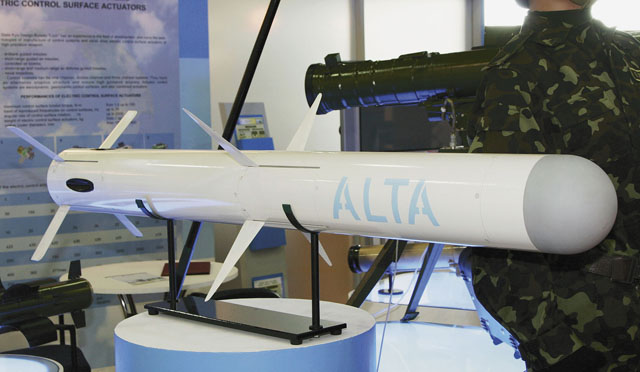
Alta helicopter launched ATGM

List of products

- Various types of anti-tank guided missiles (ATGM), anti-tank weapons systems, multiple rocket launchers (MLRS), air-launched weapons and naval guided weapon systems.
- Flight control systems, electric steering gear blocks and other components for guided precision weaponry
- Automatic control systems and systems for guided precision weaponry diagnostics
- Modernization of aviation weapons control systems
- Lifetime prolongation and restoration of guided precision weapons
- Telemetric systems for guided ammunition tests
- Optical electronic systems for tank and artillery guns, barrel bending angle measurement

=== Examples ===
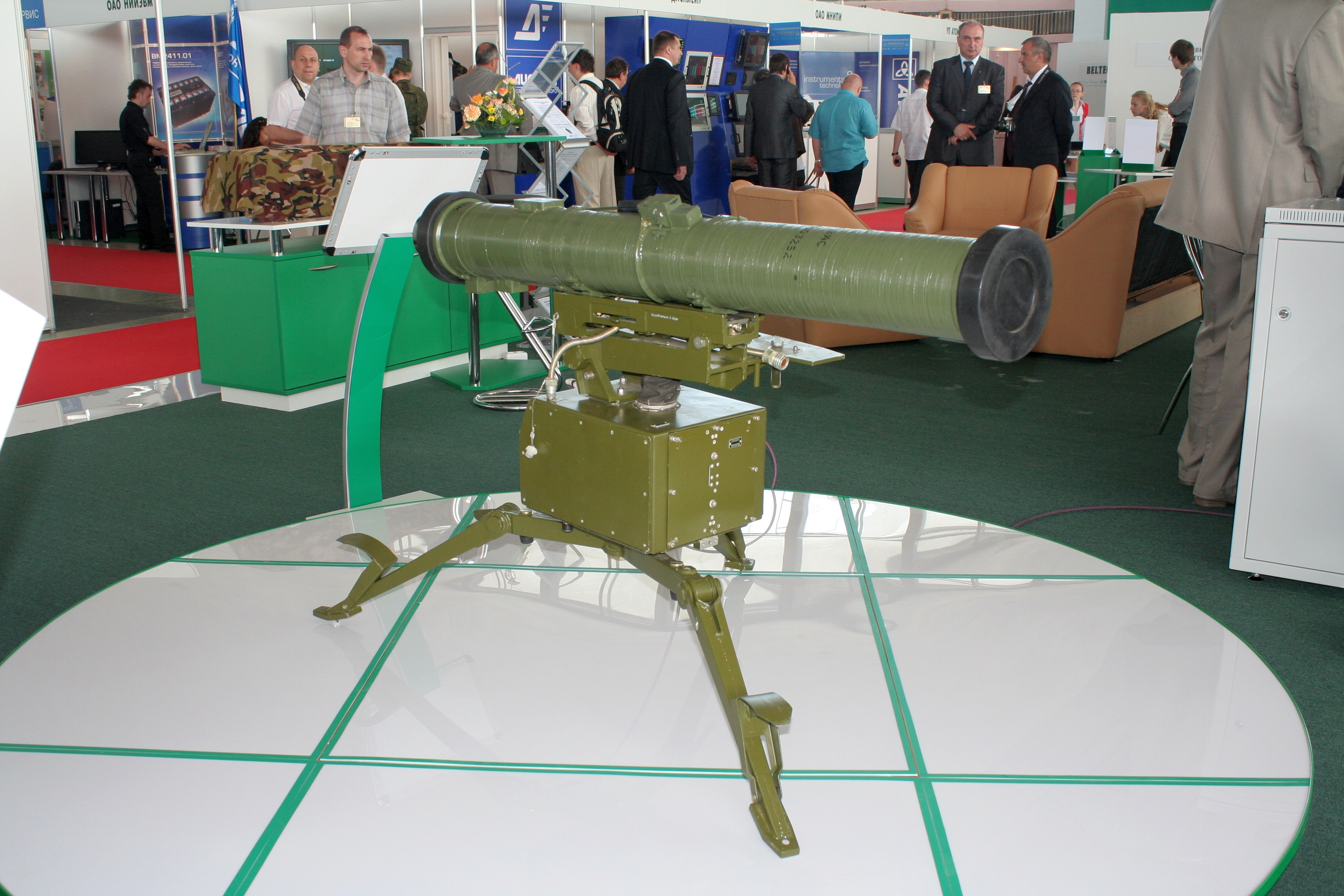
A Skif ATGM on a tripod

- Neptune anti ship cruise missile
- Dnipro SAM (joint venture with Ukroboronservice)
- Skif or Stuhna-P ATGM
- RK-3 Corsar ATGM
- Barrier ATGM
- Alta helicopter launched ATGM
- Vilkha
- RYF SAM (RK-10 missile)
- Palianytsia (missile)
- SD-300: A medium-range surface-to-air missile system featuring a range of over 100 km, 70% unified parts as with the “Neptune” coastal missile system, and the same launcher as of a Tatra chassis. Half of the factory testing completed as of 2021.
- Koral (missile) surface to air missile. First displayed in 2021, an update version was revealed in September 2026. The width has expanded from 260 to 300 mm, weight has gone from 300 to 450 kg and length from 4.33 to 4.8 meters. The new missile is claimed to intercept ballistic missiles but with a blast fragmentation compared to a Kill vehicle like used on PAC3 Patriot warheads.

== See also ==
- List of design bureaus in Ukraine
