= Military University of Technology =

Polish military-civilian academic institution

Coordinates: 52°15′11″N 20°54′01″E

- Wojskowa Akademia Techniczna im. Jarosława Dąbrowskiego
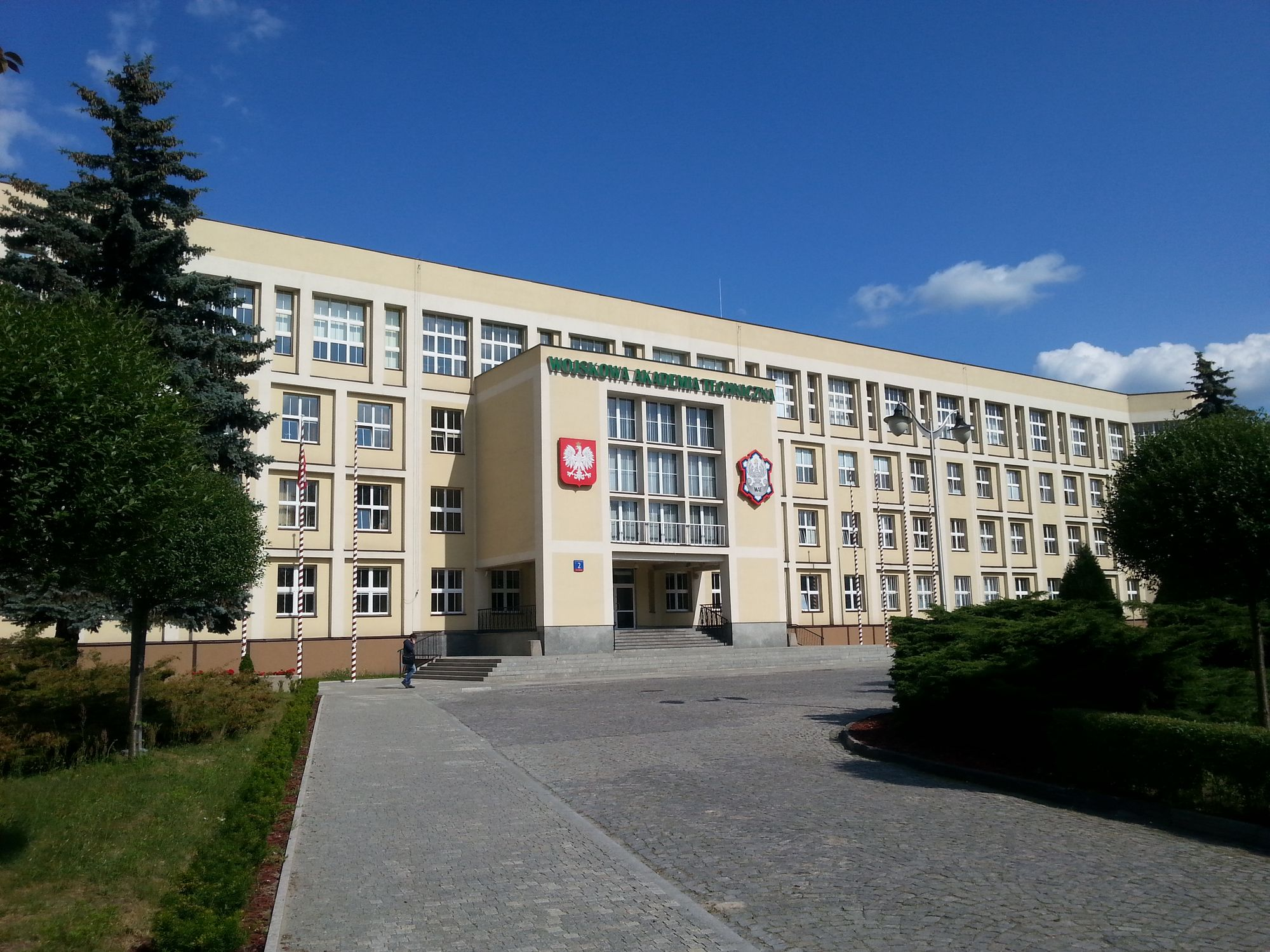
- Motto: Omnia pro patria
- Motto in English: Everything for the country
- Established: 1951
- Affiliations: EUA, Erasmus
- Rector: Brig. Gen. prof. dr hab. inż. Przemysław Wachulak
- Students: 8,014 (12.2023)
- Location: ul. gen. Sylwestra Kaliskiego 2, 00-908 Warszawa 49, Warsaw, Poland
- Website: www.wat.edu.pl
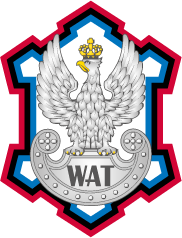

The Military University of Technology (Polish: Wojskowa Akademia Techniczna im. Jarosława Dąbrowskiego, WAT, lit. 'Jarosław Dąbrowski Military Academy of Technology') is Poland's civil-military technological academic institution, located in Warsaw's Bemowo district.

It was established in 1951. The University's rector-commander is Brig. Gen. Przemysław Wachulak. The University is supervised by Poland's Minister of National Defense and conducts scientific research for the Polish Armed Forces. The University educates nearly 10,000 students. The staff comprises some 1,000 employees, including 220 professors.

The University conducts both military and civilian studies. Military graduates receive not only the professional title of magister inżynier, but are promoted to the military rank of podporucznik (second lieutenant). Formally being professional soldiers, military students attend school on the principles of ordinary military service. They are quartered in military dormitories and attend a variety of different military trainings and lectures. After graduating, they are formally obliged to serve in Polish Armed Forces under threat of reimbursement of education costs. Only Polish citizens are eligible for military studies.

Contrary to military students, civilian ones can study normally, without any commitments to the Ministry of National Defence. Civilian studies allow to obtain professional titles such as: inżynier or licencjat (first cycle studies), magister inżynier or magister (second cycle studies) and a scientific degree of doktor. Due to changes in Polish law, since October 2019, separate Doctoral School operates in the structure of WAT. Full-time studies are free, extramural studies are payable.

Obviously, scientific research conducted in WAT focus on issues connected with military and national defense. WAT was the place where in 1963 first Polish laser was created. In 1964 analog computer ELWAT (later produced by Elwro in Wrocław) was also created in WAT. One of the biggest contemporary projects which was developed at the university was so-called Modular Firearm System, 5.56 mm MSBS rifle, currently manufactured and further developed by FB "Łucznik" Radom. The rifle is to become the next main service rifle of the Polish Armed Forces.

WAT continues to develop its research and educational infrastructure, expanding its specialist and interdisciplinary laboratories, Academic Entrepreneurship Incubator, Technology Transfer Centre, Security Engineering Centre, National Space and Satellite Engineering Centre, Advanced Energy Technologies Centre, Reconnaissance and Electronic Warfare Support Centre, Mobile Robots Centre, and the Quality Certification Centre.

The courses offered by the university are accredited by the Polish Accreditation Committee (PKA) and the Accreditation Commission of Universities of Technology (KAUT). Among the courses offered there are those that have been awarded Educational Excellence Certificates:

– in the Excellent Course – Excellence in Education category: cryptology and cybersecurity;

– in the Always for the Student category – Excellencein Student Development Support: information technology.

== Faculties ==
The educational process and scientific research are conducted at eight academic faculties:

- Faculty of Cybernetics,
- Faculty of Electronics,
- Faculty of Civil Engineering and Geodesy,
- Faculty of Security, Logistics and Management,
- Faculty of Mechanical Engineering,
- Faculty of Mechatronics and Aviation,
- Faculty of Advanced Technologies and Chemistry,
- Institute of Optoelectronics.

== Education and Science ==
WAT runs over 40 types of studies, including full-time and part-time studies (BSC/BA), second degree studies (MSC), and long-cycle Master’s studies. The educational offer also includes post-graduate studies, such as MBA studies, various specialist courses and training programmes.

Military University of Technology provide education in over 90 specialties across over 30 courses:

• public administration in the national security system

• national security (polish, english)

• biocybernetics and biomedical engineering

• road and bridge construction

• civil engineering

• chemistry (polish, english)

• communication infrastructure operation

• electronics and telecommunication (polish, english)

• power engineering

• geodesy and geoinformation technology

• geodesy and cartography

• geodesy and cadastre

• geoinformation technology

• information technology

• safety engineering

• geospatial engineering

• space and satellite engineering

• materials engineering (polish, english)

• unmanned systems engineering

• cryptology and cybersecurity

• logistics (practical profile)

• economic logistics (practical profile)

• logistics (general academic profile)

• aeronautics and astronautics (polish, english)

• mechanics and design of machines

• mechatronics (polish, english)

• state defence (practical profile)

• optoelectronics (polish, english)

• breakthrough technologies

• management.

Officer candidates are offered 13 element cycle Master’s degree courses. During their studies, cadets receive accommodation, food, uniforms, and monthly compensation funded by the Ministry of National Defence Republic of Poland.

WAT runs over 40 types of studies, including full- -time and part-time studies (BSC/BA), second degree studies (MSC), and long-cycle Master’s studies. The educational offer also includes post-graduate studies, such as MBA studies, various specialist courses and training programmes.

DOCTORAL SCHOOL

WAT launched the doctoral school in 2019, first among the universities subject to the Ministry of National Defence Republic of Poland supervision.

The Doctoral School provides doctoral education in three scientific fields and seven disciplines.

Moreover, WAT is authorised to grant the degree of “doktor habilitowany” in the same scientific disciplines:

Engineering and technical sciences:

• automatics, electronics, electrical engineering, and space technology

• technical information technology and telecommunication

• civil engineering, geodesy, and transport

• materials engineering

• mechanical engineering

Social sciences:

• security sciences

Exact and natural sciences:

• chemical sciences.
