= Oleh Korostelyov =

Ukrainian engineer and researcher (born 1949)

Hero of Ukraine Oleh Korostelyov OS
- Олег Коростельов
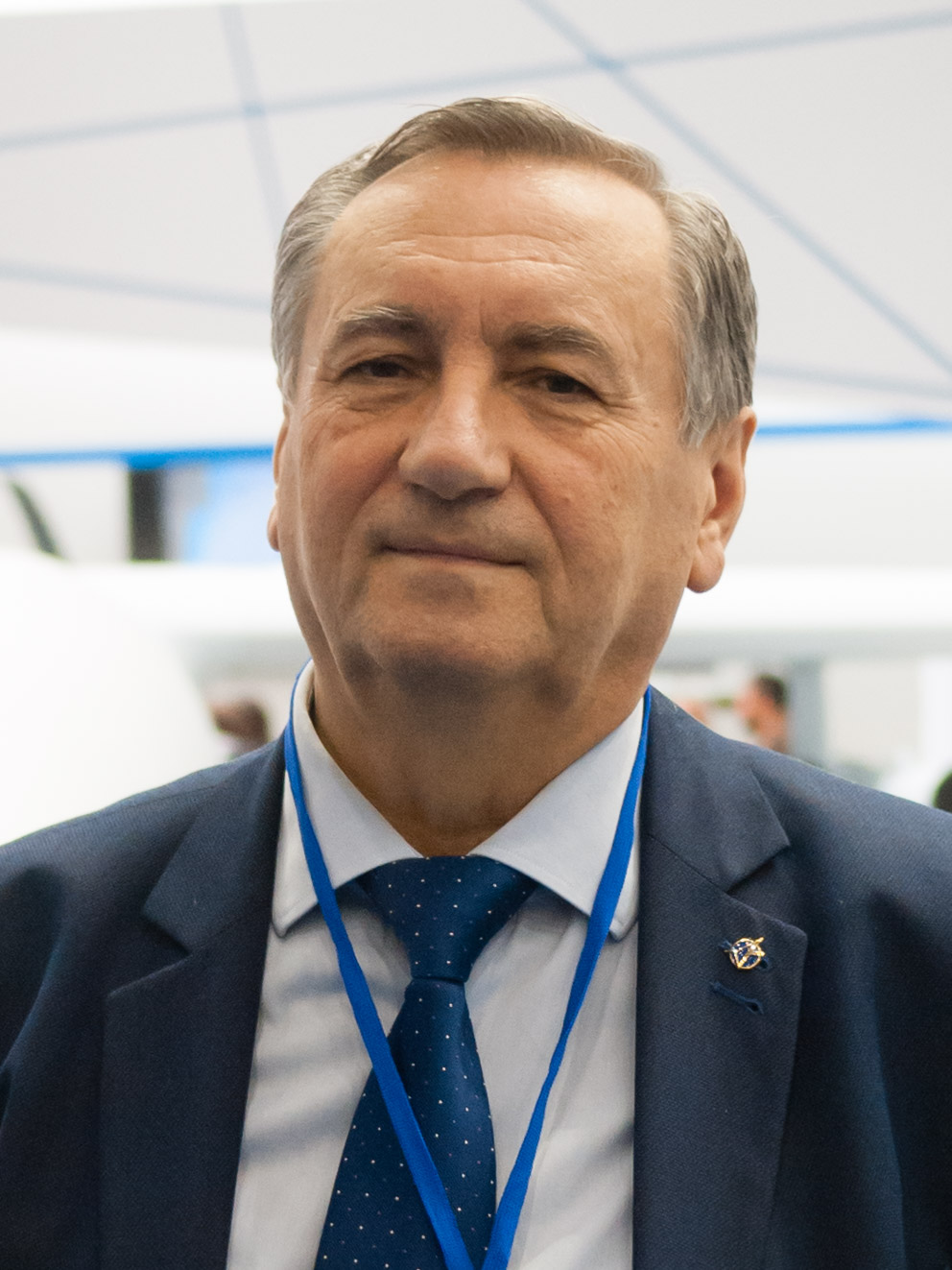
- Korostelyov in 2021
- Born: 9 November 1949 (age 77); Kirovohrad, Ukrainian SSR, Soviet Union
- Education: National Aviation University
- Occupations: Engineer; researcher; professor
- Organization: Director General of Luch Design Bureau
- Awards: Hero of Ukraine

Oleh Petrovych Korostelyov (Ukrainian: Олег Петрович Коростельов; born 9 November 1949) is a Ukrainian engineer, research and professor who is the Hero of Ukraine and a full Cavalier of Order of Merit. Since 2003, he has been the director general of Luch Design Bureau. His areas of expertise include guided weapons systems and automated operation of specialized aircraft equipment.

== Early life and education ==
Born on 9 November 1949, in the Ukrainian city of Kirovohrad. He started attending secondary school No. 6 m. Kirovohrad in 1956. He received a silver medal upon graduating from high school in 1966. He enrolled at the Kyiv Institute of Civil Aviation Engineers (now National Aviation University) in 1967 and earned his electronic computer degree with honors in 1972.

== Career ==
In 1978, Korostelyov resumed his employment at the Octava company. Since 2003, he has transitioned from engineer-designer to director-general of the Luch Design Bureau. Under his direct supervision, automatic control tools for special aviation equipment were developed that meet international standards. The Gurt complex, in particular, is now effectively operating in over 30 nations.

Korostelyov has been personally involved in research and development since 1997, working on items related to the following topics: Combat, Stugna, Edge, Coper, and R-360 Neptune. Based on this, Luch Design Bureau went on to produce a range of highly accurate weaponry, including Barrier and Skif. He has been the company's director general and general designer since December 2003.

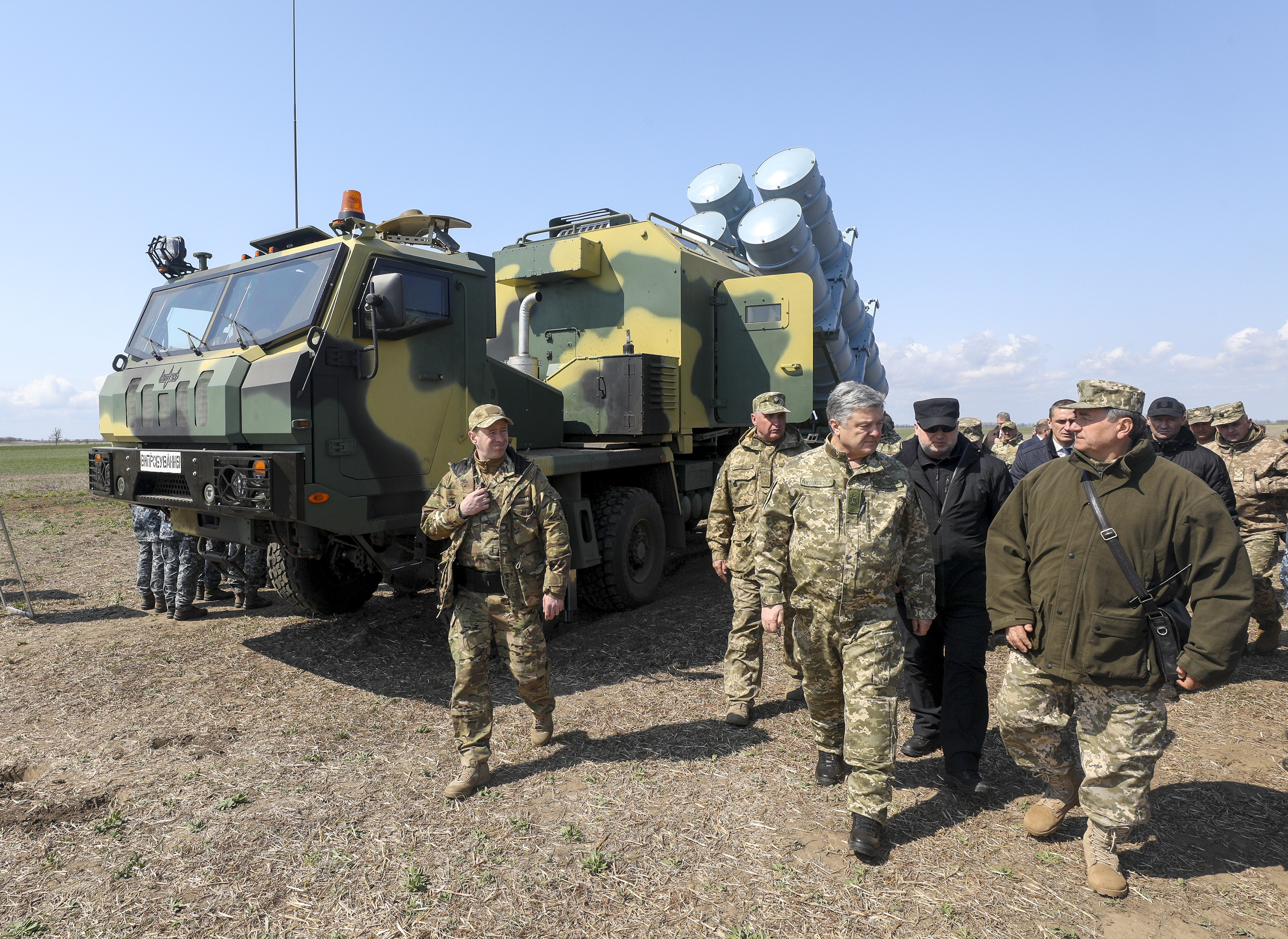
President Petro Poroshenko and Korostelyov in 2019

Following the annexation of Crimea and War in Donbas in 2013, Korostelyov-led Luch created the first Ukrainian UAV, known as Sokil-2. The Ukrainian Ground Forces now uses it with success. Additionally, the bureau is completing the creation of the Sokil-200 UCAV, which has a cutting-edge navigation system and four anti-tank missiles. In addition, he turned the Soviet Union's Smerch into the Alder and built the country's Bayraktar, and the Sokil-300 UCAV.

Since 2016, the company's profit has climbed by 25 times to 516 million UAH, while its income has increased by 13 times to 6.7 billion UAH. Three-quarters of the company's clients are overseas, mostly from the Middle East; the remaining 65% are state consumers. In 2018, the Ukrainian Armed Forces adopted the Vilkha. Later on, Vilkha-M, the improved version, emerged. In April 2019, Alder-M had its initial testing.

Adopted in 2020, the R-360 Neptune was announced to have the potential to become a weapon of mass destruction. The government contemplated creating a position of Deputy Prime Minister for him in March that same year, and Korostelyov was the lone applicant taken into consideration. He also declined to take a role in the incoming Cabinet of Ministers in spite of this. He consented to take on the role of chairman of National Aviation University's supervisory board on 6 December 2023. Ten scholarships have been awarded by the National Association of Defense Industry Enterprises of Ukraine to assist students wishing to attend National Aviation University.

== Personal life ==
Korostelyov was born into a military family. He has three flats in Kyiv, a property in Novi Petrivtsi, the hamlet where Viktor Yushchenko was born, many land parcels in the Kyiv Oblast, an unfinished dacha, and two pricey SUVs, a Mercedes-Benz GLS350 and a Nissan Pathfinder. His salary is around 600,000 hryvnias per year.

== Awards and recognitions ==
He received the Ministry of Defence's distinction in 2015 and an honorary breastplate for his contributions to the Ukrainian Armed Forces in 2016. Notably, he was awarded the title of Candidate of Technical Sciences in 2002, and later the Doctor of Technical Sciences with a focus on Arms and Military Equipment in 2008. Korostelyov has received awards and recognitions such as:

- Hero of Ukraine Order of the State (22 August 2020)
- Order of Merit First Class (2 May 2018)
- Order of Merit Second Class (21 August 2015)
- Order of Merit Third Class (19 August 2008)
- Honored Machine Builder of Ukraine (24 September 2004)
- State Prize of Ukraine in Science and Technology (1999)
- Kyiv Badge of Honor (23 November 2022)
- Honorary Aircraft Builder of Ukraine
- Doctor of Technical Sciences (2008)
