= Stuhna (disambiguation) =

The Stuhna is a river in Ukraine. Stuhna or Stugna may also refer to:

- Stugna 100-mm gun-launched antitank guided missile
- Skif (anti-tank guided missile) antitank guided missile system, also known as Stuhna-P
