= National Aviation University =

University in Kyiv, Ukraine

Coordinates: 50°27′00″N 30°31′24″E

Kyiv Aviation Institute National University
- Національний університет "Київський авіаційний інститут"
- University logo
- Motto: Vivere!Vincere!Creare!
- Motto in English: Live! Win! Create!
- Type: State university
- Established: 1933
- Affiliation: Ministry of Education and Science of Ukraine
- Academic affiliation: ORCID
- Rector: Kseniia Semenova
- Administrative staff: ~1500
- Students: ~11600
- Location: Kyiv, Ukraine
- Website: www.nau.edu.ua/en

University rankings

Regional – Overall
- QS Emerging Europe and Central Asia: 251-300 (2022)

The Kyiv Aviation Institute National University (Ukrainian: Національний університет "Київський авіаційний інститут") is a state-sponsored aviation university in Kyiv, Ukraine.

The university started in 1933 when the Kyiv Aviation Institute was founded on the basis of the mechanical department of Kyiv Machine-Building Institute. The university consists of five institutes, ten separate faculties, two lyceums, six colleges and Military Training Department. The university has its own Culture and Arts Center, Aviation Medical Center, Flight Training Center, Training and Sports Wellness Center, Scientific and Technical Library, “Aviator” newspaper and a yacht club. The university also supports the State Aviation Museum.

== Main historical dates ==
- 1898 – Kiev Polytechnic Institute mechanical department
- 1933 – Kiev Aviation Institute
- 1947 – Kiev Institute of Civil Air Fleet
- 1965 – Kiev Institute of Civil Aviation Engineers
- 1994 – Kyiv International University of Civil Aviation
- 2000 – National Aviation University
- 07.11.2024 – Kyiv Aviation Institute

== Overview ==
Founded in 1933, over the years of operation, the university has trained over 200,000 professionals.

Today, about 25,000 students are studying in the university, including nearly 1,500 foreigners from 55 countries. SU KAI incorporates five institutes, ten faculties, military training department, six colleges, two lyceums. SU KAI trains bachelors, masters, candidates, and doctors of science. It became the leading institution for training specialists in civil aviation. The university has scientific schools in the fields of mechanics, management, electronics, materials science, electrical engineering, computer science and computer facilities. Academic activities are performed by a scientific and pedagogical team, including 15 academicians, corresponding members of the Academy of Science of Ukraine, 184 doctors of sciences, professors, 677 candidates of sciences and senior lecturers, 80 honored people in science and engineering of Ukraine and winners of State prizes.

Rector of State University "Kyiv Aviation Institute" is a Professor Lutskyi Maksym.

== International activities of the university ==
The university has joined the Bologna Convention that makes it possible for students to get diplomas of international standard and improve students’ mobility. The university professors and students collaborate internationally with universities in Spain, Great Britain, Germany, the Netherlands, France, South Korea and other countries. The university also cooperates with the International Civil Aviation Organization (ICAO). Two ICAO European Regional Training Centers are successfully functioning for aviation personnel training and upgrading.

== University facilities ==
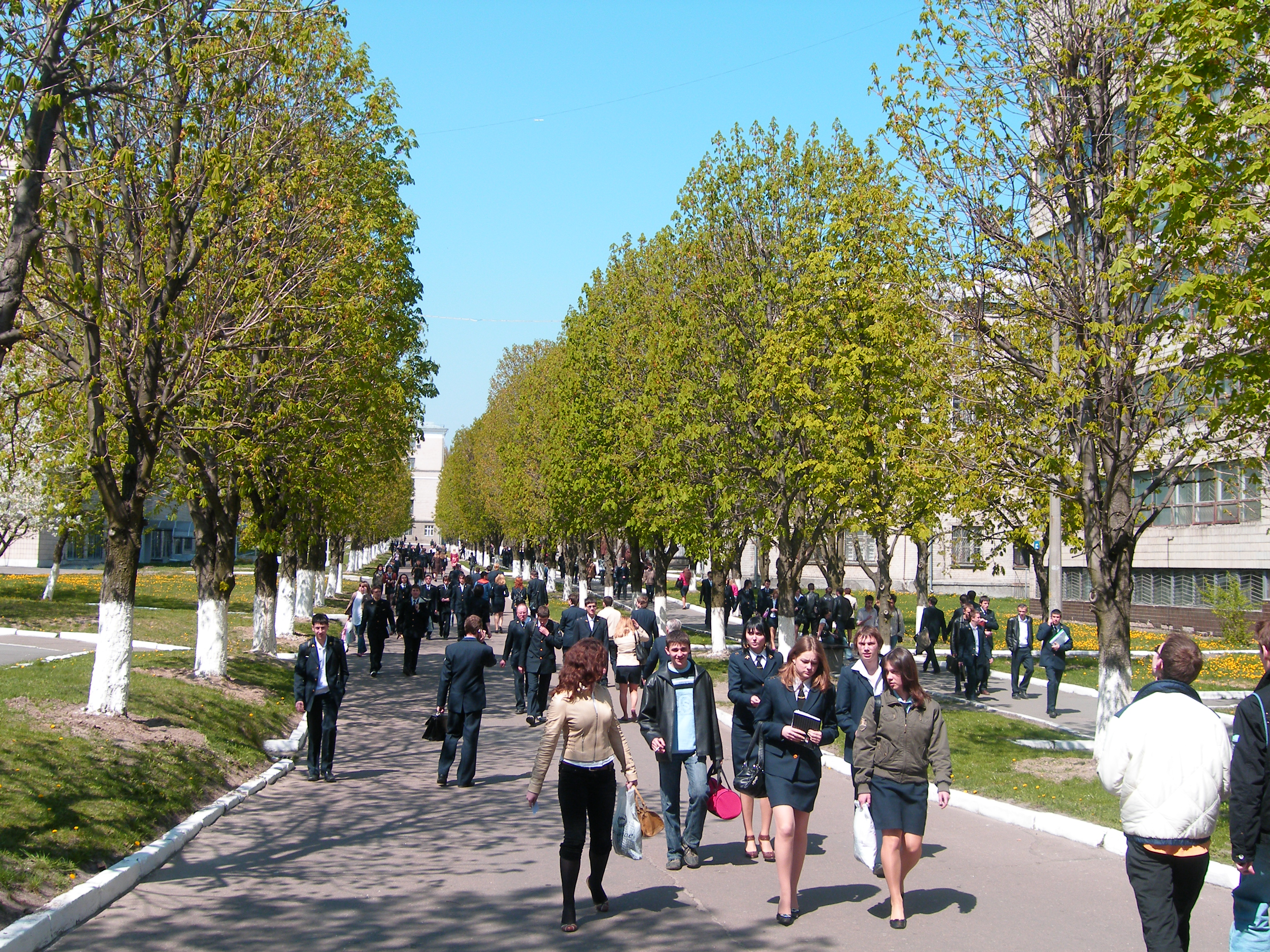
Main campus in Kyiv

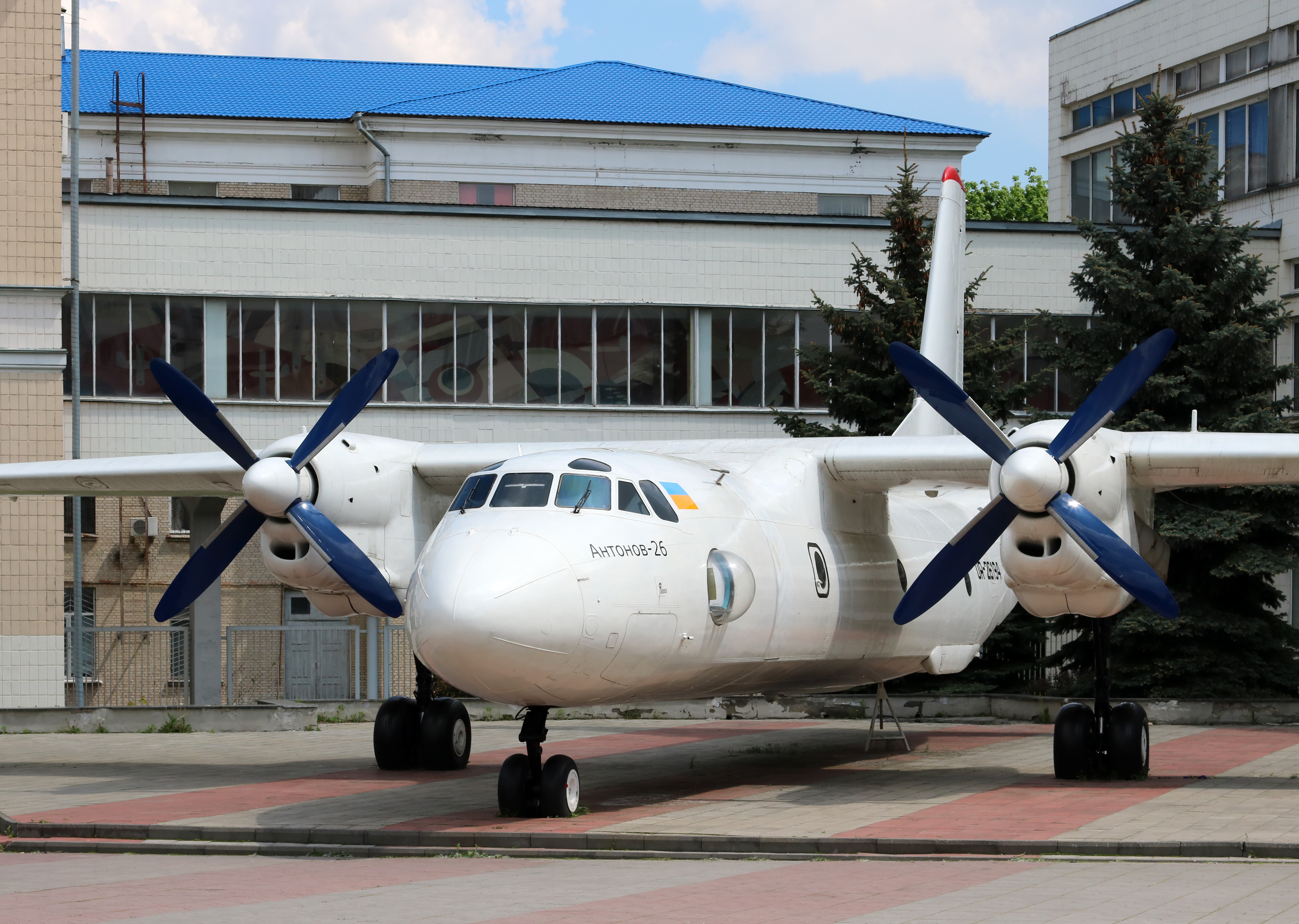
Antonov An-26 in the National Aviation University

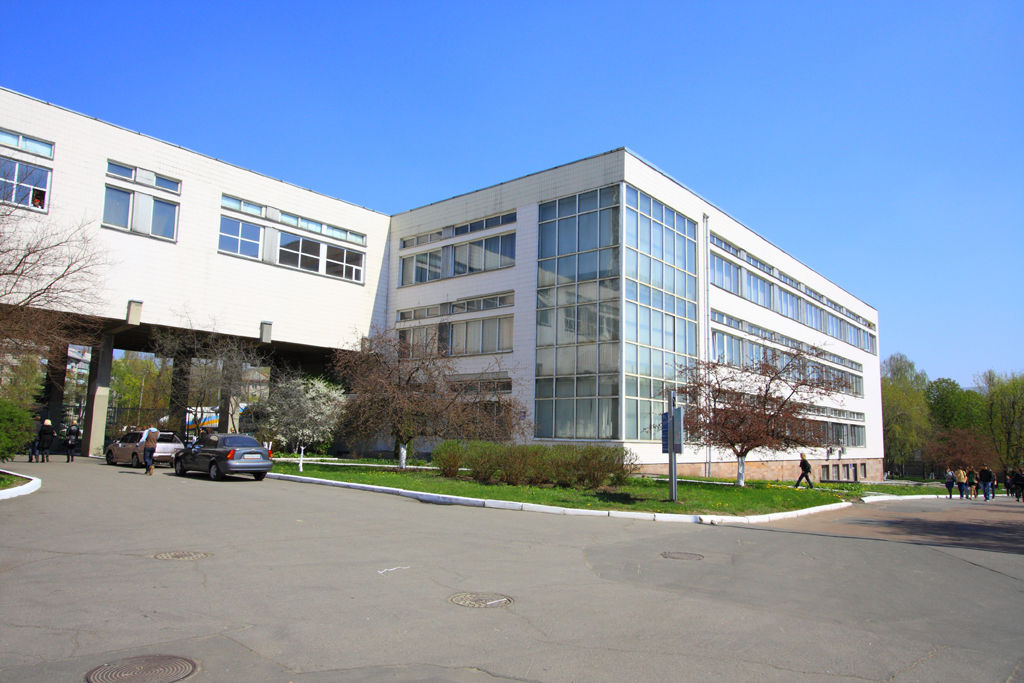
Library in the National Aviation University

The university occupies a total area of about 90 hectares. There are 14 academic buildings standing on 150 000 square meters.

Within the framework of realization of the state investment project titled “International Pilot Training Center of State University "Kyiv Aviation Institute” the university is successfully establishing high-quality training of pilots.

The K-10 SWIFT, Cessna 172, and four Tecnam 2002 aircraft, as well as the ALSIM aircraft simulator, have been purchased to train Cessna, Tecnam, and Boeing-737 pilots. The scientific and technical library has a resource of about 2,6 million books.

The State University "Kyiv Aviation Institute", the only one in Ukraine, has a unique hangar with 75 airplanes and helicopters, radio equipment, a training aerodrome with aviation ground handling equipment, an aerodynamic training complex equipped with a wind tunnel, and the State Museum of Aviation. Students of the university also have access to the Sports Complex, the Arts and Culture Centre, the Medical Centre, accommodation in one among the 11 hostels, a cafeteria with a seating capacity for 1000 people at a time, memberships in the Billiard Club and e-club, all located within the students' campus.

== Structure of the university ==
More than 25,000 students study at the National Aviation University today, among them 1500 foreign students from more than 55 countries.

The State University "Kyiv Aviation Institute" consists of:

Institutes:

1. Institute of International Cooperation and Education
2. Institute of Innovative Technologies and Leadership
3. Educational and Scientific Institute of Continuing Education
4. Educational and Scientific Institute of Innovative Educational Technologies
5. NAU's ICAO Training Institute

Faculties:

1. Aerospace Faculty
2. Faculty of Air Navigation, Electronics and Telecommunications
3. Faculty of Architecture, Construction and Design
4. Faculty of Environmental Safety, Engineering and Technology
5. Faculty of Economics and Business Administration
6. Faculty of Cybersecurity, Computer and Software Engineering
7. Faculty of Linguistics and Social Communications
8. Faculty of International Relations
9. Faculty of Transport, Management and Logistics
10. Law Faculty
11. Military Training Department

Lyceums:

- Aerospace Lyceum
- Higher Vocational School

Colleges:

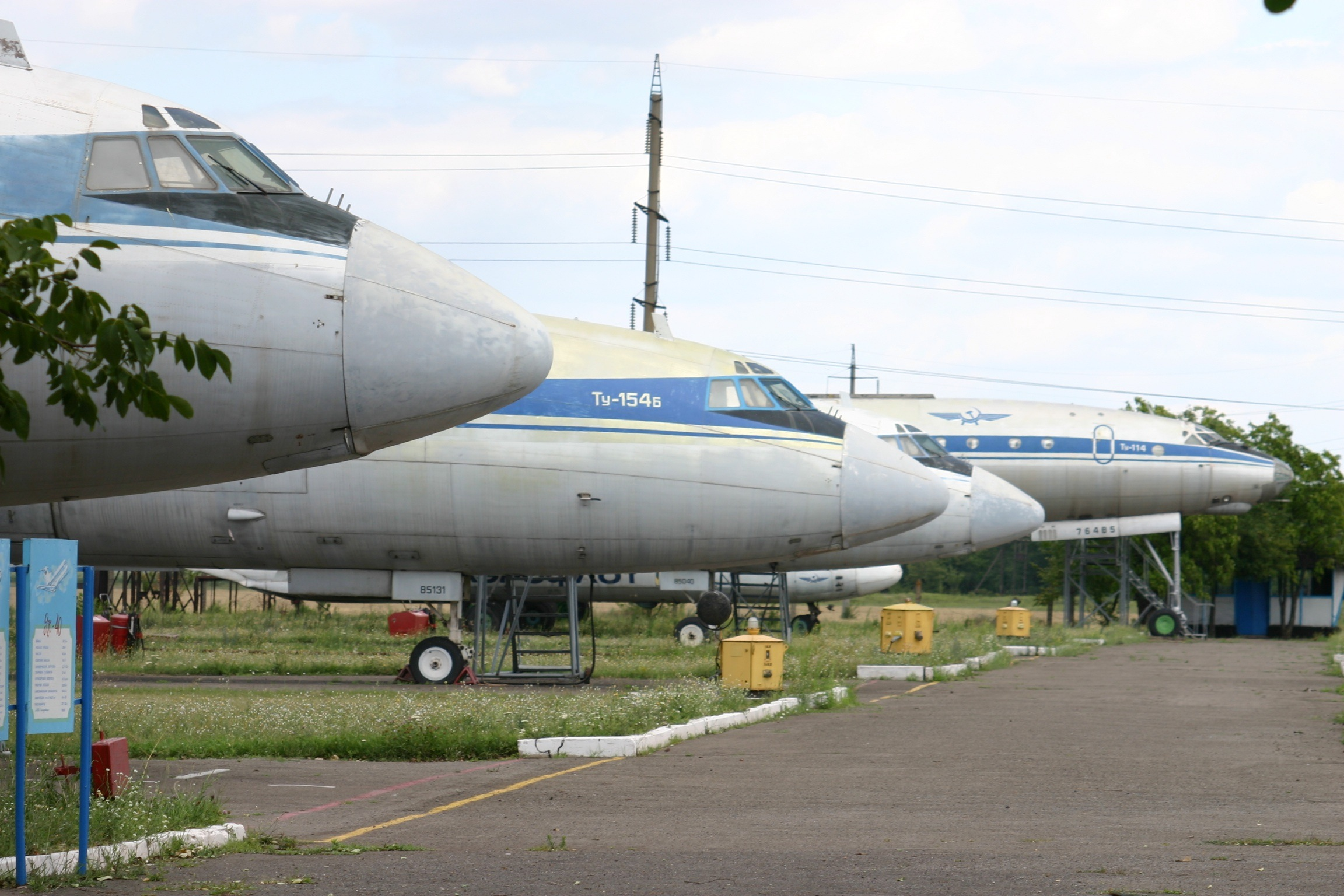
Aviation Museum in Kryvyi Rih

1. College of Information Technologies and Land Management
2. College of Engineering and Management
3. Slovyansk College
4. Kryvyi Rih College
5. Vasylkiv College
6. Kyiv College of Computer Technology and Economics

12 research institutes and subdivisions: Research Institute of Technological Systems within Ministry of Education and Science of Ukraine and; Ministry of Industrial Policy; Research Institute of Integrated Telecommunication Technologies; SRI of the Fleeting Processes; SRI of Design; SRI "Aviatest"; State Research Institute of Aviation; Aerospace Center; Aerodynamic Research Center of National Aviation University of Ukraine; The Research Design Bureau "Buran"; Center "Air traffic service"; Training Center (gymnasium); Ukrainian National Research Center of Certification of Combustive-lubricating Materials and Technical Liquids;

== Honorable doctors and famous alumni ==
- Olumuyiwa Benard Aliu – President of the ICAO Council
- Pavel Grachev – Defense Minister (Russia)
- Borys Paton – President of the National Academy of Sciences of Ukraine
- Leonid Kuchma – President of Ukraine
- Yang Ho Cho – President and CEO "Korean Airlines" (Korea)
- Elizaveta Shahkhatuni – Soviet aeronautical engineer and professor
- Versand Hakobyan – Armenian oligarch and politician
- Oleh Korostelyov – Ukrainian engineer and scientist
- Ascad Kotayt – President of the ICAO Council
- Renato Claudio Costa Pereira – Secretary General of ICAO
- Nishikawa Eykiti-Honorary Consul General of Ukraine in Western Japan (Japan)
- Song Kyl Hogue – President Hankukskoho Aviation University (Korea)
- Eugenio Dominguez Vilches – Rector of the University of Cordoba (Spain)
- Krystyan Aegiali – Director of the European and North Atlantic region ICAO
- Krivtsov Vladimir S. – President of the National Aerospace University. NE Zhukovsky
- Edmundas Zavadskas – Rector of Vilnius Technical University (Lithuania)
- Yuri Davydov – President of the National Academy of Applied Sciences (Russia)
- Antonio Cuoco – CEO airline "Lufthansa" in Ukraine (Germany)
- Inozemtsev Alexander – Director – General Designer of OAO "Avyadvyhatel" (Russia)
- Anatoliy P. Shpak – First Vice – President, Chief Scientific Secretary of the Academy of Sciences of Ukraine
- Elmar Shryufer – Professor Technical University of Munich (Germany)
- Chernomyrdin Viktor Stepanovich – Ambassador Extraordinary and Plenipotentiary of Russia to Ukraine
- Mitchell Fox – Head of the Department of ICAO to develop policies and standards for training aviation specialists
- Romualdas Mechislavovich Hinyavychyus – Rector of Vilnius Technical University. Gediminas (Lithuania)
- Stogniy Boris S. – National Academy of Sciences of Ukraine
- Shidlovskii Anatoly Korniyovych – NAS of Ukraine
- Pashayev Arif Mir Jalal oglu – Rector of the National Academy of aircraft (Azerbaijan)
- Muravchenko Fyodor – General Designer state enterprise "Zaporozhye Machine-Building Design Bureau" Progress "them. Acad. O. Ivanchenko
- Troshchenko Valery T. – Director of the Institute for Problems of Strength of. GS Pisarenko Nano
- Raymond Benjamin – Secretary General of ICAO
- Renat Kuzmin Ravaliyovych – Deputy Prosecutor General of Ukraine
- Kremen Vasily – President of the Academy of Pedagogical Sciences of Ukraine

== See also ==
List of universities in Ukraine
