= Tatra 816 =

T816 ARMAX
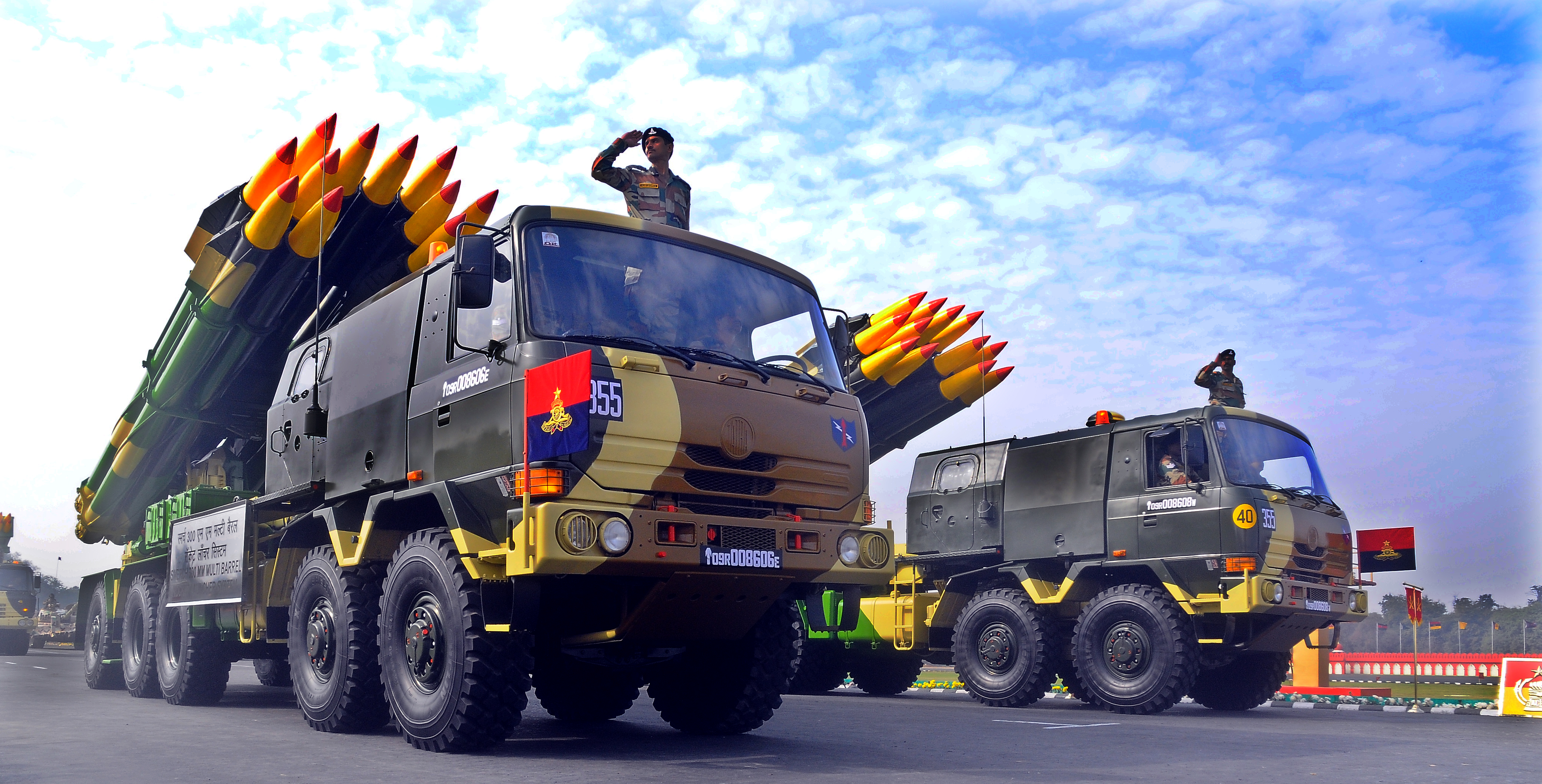
- Indian BM-30 Smerch launchers on Indian built Tatra 816 during a military parade

Overview
- Manufacturer: Tatra
- Production: 2006–2025
- Assembly: Kopřivnice, Moravia, Czech Republic

Body and chassis
- Class: Heavy truck
- Body style: COE

Powertrain
- Engine: Diesel naturally aspirated or turbocharged: Tatra (air-cooled); V8
- Transmission: Tatra; 10 speed manual (10TS180); auxiliary two-speed

Chronology
- Predecessor: Tatra T815
- Successor: Tatra 815-7

T816 FORCE

Overview
- Manufacturer: Tatra
- Production: 1996–2025
- Assembly: Kopřivnice, Moravia, Czech Republic

Body and chassis
- Class: Heavy Truck
- Body style: COE

Powertrain
- Engine: Diesel naturally aspirated or turbocharged Deutz: V6 (11.9 L); V8 (15.8 L); Cummins: L10 (10.0 L); M11 (10.8 L); ISM (10.8 L); ISL (8.9 L); ISB (5.9 L); CAT: C13 (12.5 L); C15 (15.2 L); C18 (18.1 L); Detroit: 6067SK60 (11.1 L); MTU: V12 (183TD224)(22.5 L)
- Transmission: TwinDisc: 6-speed automatic (TD-61-1175); 10 speed automatic (TD-101-3600); Allison: 5- & 6-speed automatic

Chronology
- Predecessor: Tatra T815
- Successor: Tatra 815-7

The Tatra T816 was a truck family, produced by Czech company Tatra. It uses the traditional tatra concept of rigid backbone tube and swinging half-axles giving independent suspension. The vehicles are available in 4x4, 6x6, 8x8, 10x8, 10x10, 12x8, and 12x12 variants. The truck was developed from the model T815 to comply with the most demanding off-road conditions. Originally the T816 range was developed for military purposes; however, now there are also civilian applications (notably as heavy off-road firefighting trucks).

The T816 family has two categories. The T816 Armax range, which is more similar to the civilian T815 TERRN°1 range, but optimised for military use. The T816 Force range offers the heaviest trucks customized for the respective military customers. While the Armax range uses Tatra air-cooled engines and gearboxes, the Force uses water-cooled engines and gearboxes of other manufacturers.
