= Vilkha =

Ukrainian guided missile for MLRS

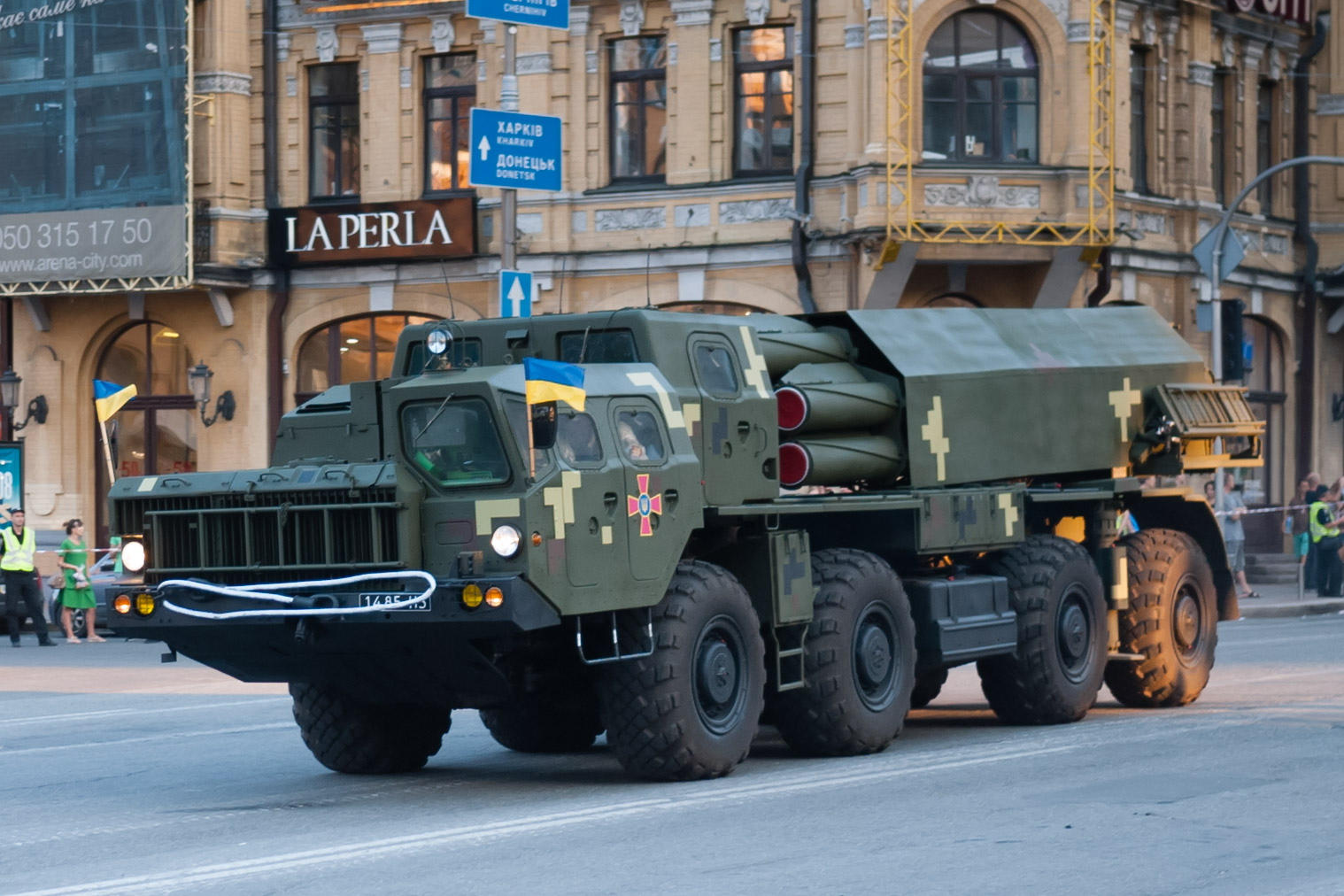
- Vilkha in the Kyiv Independence Day Parade, 2018
- Type: Multiple rocket launcher
- Place of origin: Ukraine

Service history
- In service: 2018-present
- Used by: Ukrainian Ground Forces
- Wars: 2022 Russian invasion of Ukraine

Specifications
- Mass: 33 tons
- Width: 3.05 m
- Crew: 4
- Caliber: 300 mm
- Barrels: 12
- Engine: YaMZ-7511.10 turbocharged diesel engine
- Suspension: 8×8 wheeled

Test launch, 2019

Vilkha (Ukrainian: «Вільха», "Alder tree") is a Ukrainian heavy multiple rocket launcher that fires guided missiles. Designed by the Luch Design Bureau, it was based on the BM-30 Smerch rocket launch system and developed in the 2010s. Vilkha entered service in the Ukrainian armed forces in 2018.

== Operational use ==
The Vilkha was developed in the 2010s, based on the 1980s BM-30 Smerch. It entered service in 2018 with the Ukrainian Army. It uses two legs to stabilize the truck during firing. It has a crew of four and can fire all twelve missiles in 45 seconds. The claimed truck speed is 100 km/h using a turbocharged diesel YaMZ-7511.10 engine. The rockets that it fires are claimed to have micromotors that boost the range of the rocket and also keep it stable in flight. It has an automatic and manual fire control system.

Using the existing body of a 9M55 rocket with a range of 70 km and a 250 kg warhead, the upgraded R624 rocket adds a new solid-fuel engine, GPS-aided inertial guidance, 90 small attitude control motors (holes emitting propellant) and aerodynamic vanes that extend during the final approach to achieve a circular error probable (CEP) of 10 m. The upgraded Vilkha-M uses the improved R624M rocket, which reduces warhead weight to 170 kg to reach a longer range of 130 km, though with less accuracy of 30 m CEP. Projectiles that extend range even further are in development.

The Vilkha has been seen in use with the Ukrainian Ground Forces during the 2022 Russian invasion of Ukraine. Ivan Vinnyk, first deputy head of the National Association of Ukrainian Defense Industries has confirmed on 1 March 2023 that “Yes, the Vilkha has been used in combat,” first used in May 2022. Vilkha-M rockets have a greater range and heavier payload compared to GMLRS rockets fired by U.S.-supplied M142 HIMARS.

== Specifications ==
Rocket

- Caliber: 300 mm
- Maximum range: 70 km Vilkha, 130 km Vilkha-M
- Accuracy: CEP 10 m Vilkha, CEP 30 m Vilkha-M
- Warhead weight: 250 kg Vilkha, 170 kg Vilkha-M
- Guidance: GPS/INS

== Operators ==
- Ukraine - Ukrainian Ground Forces

== Gallery ==
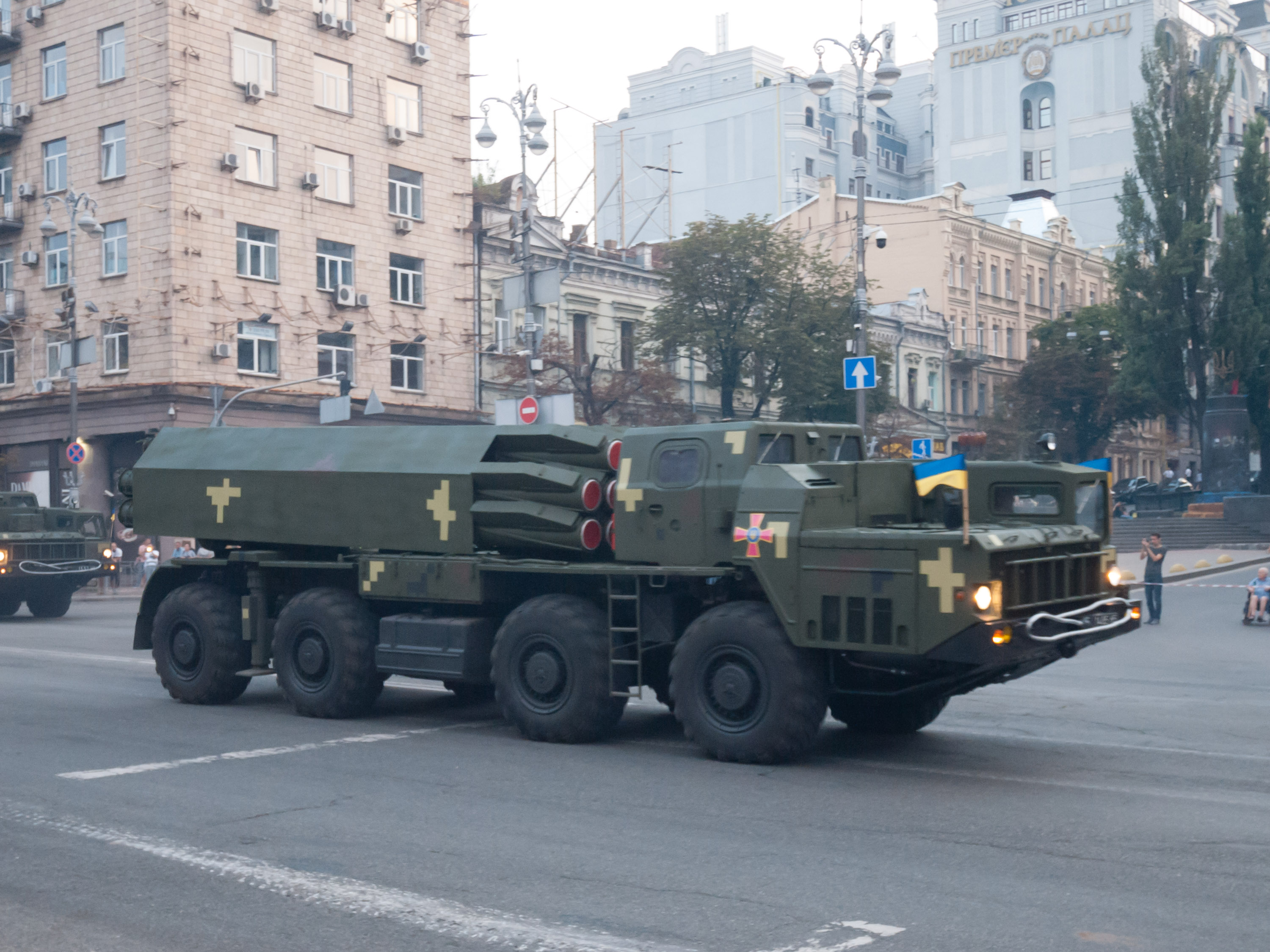

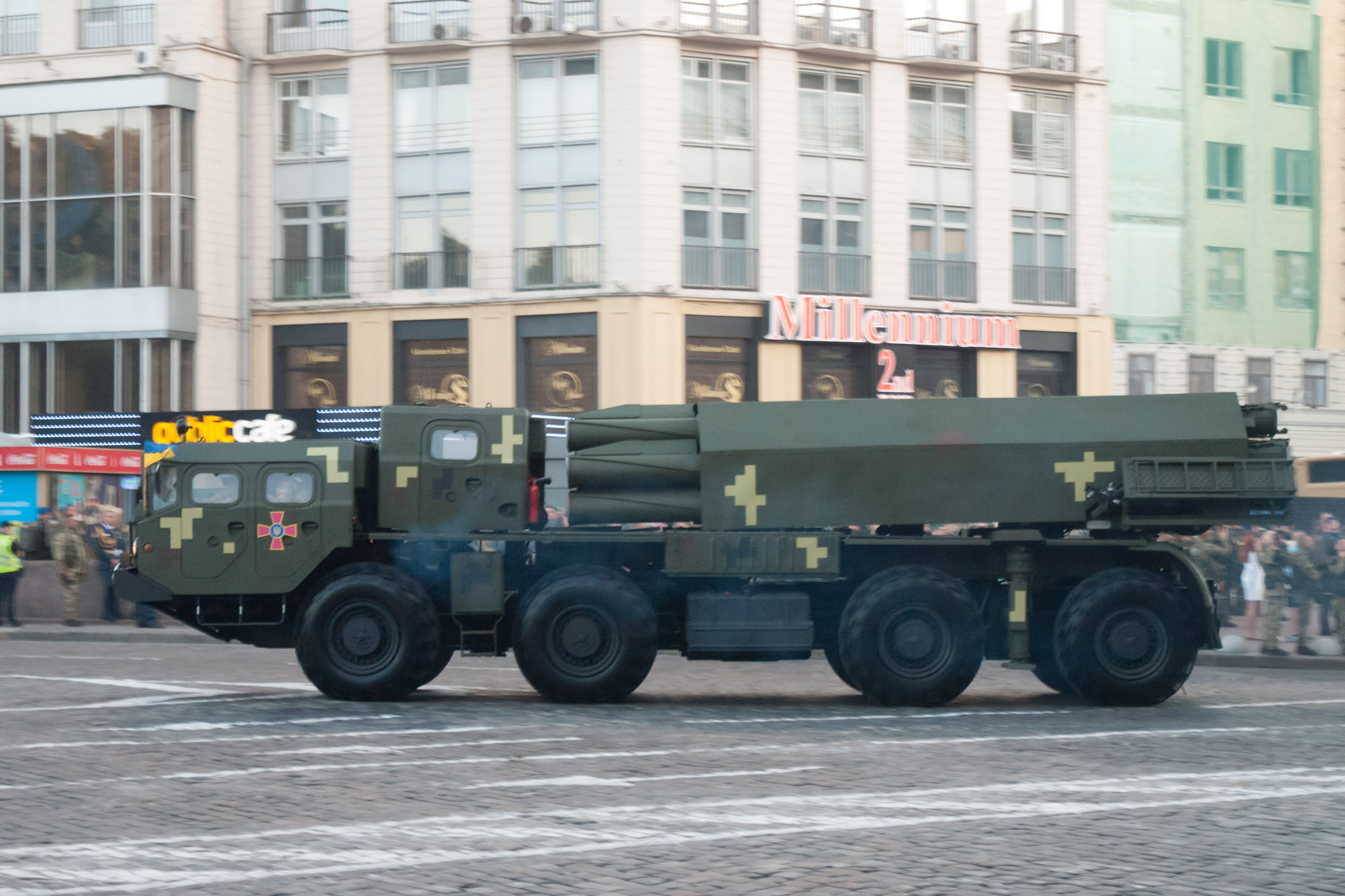

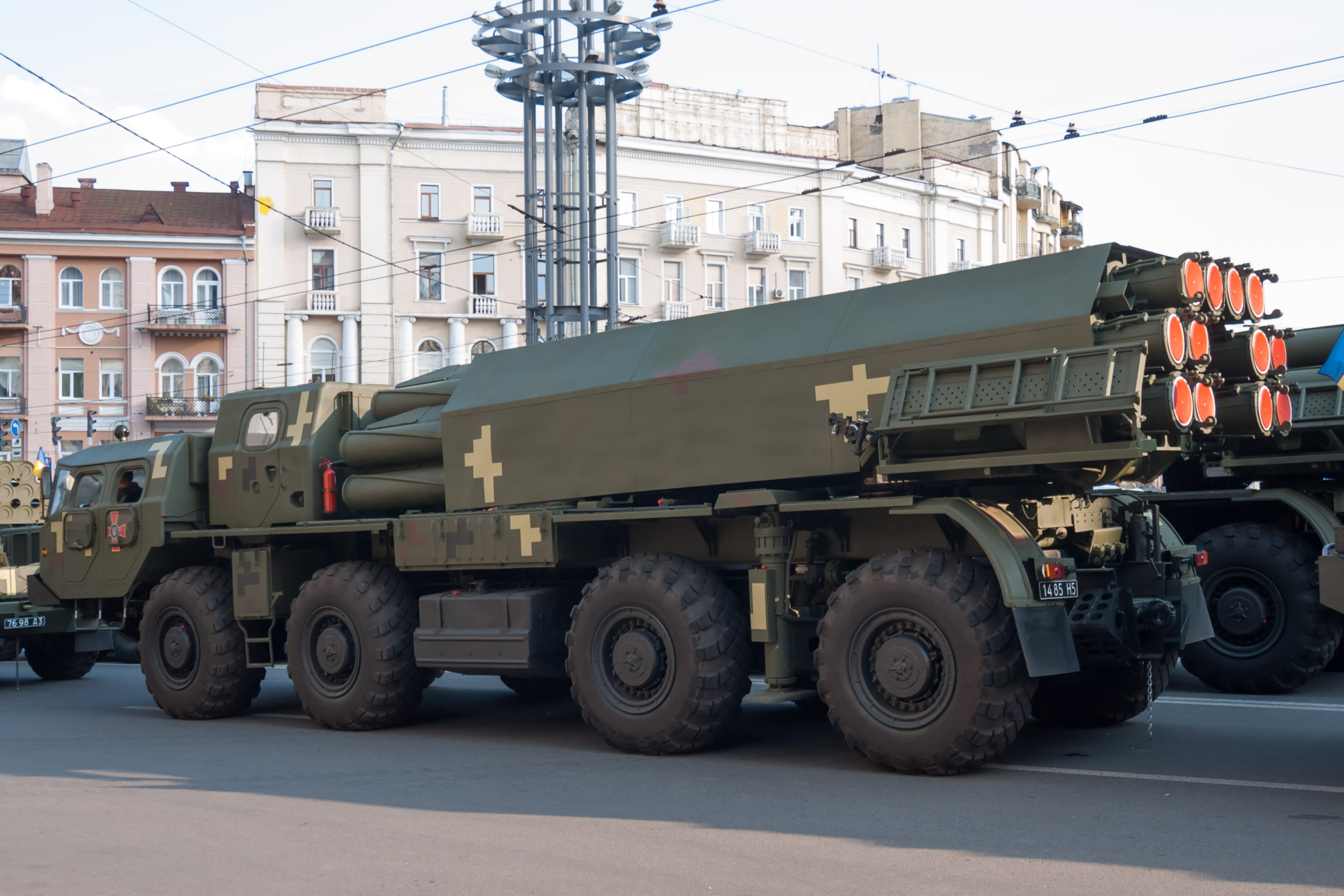

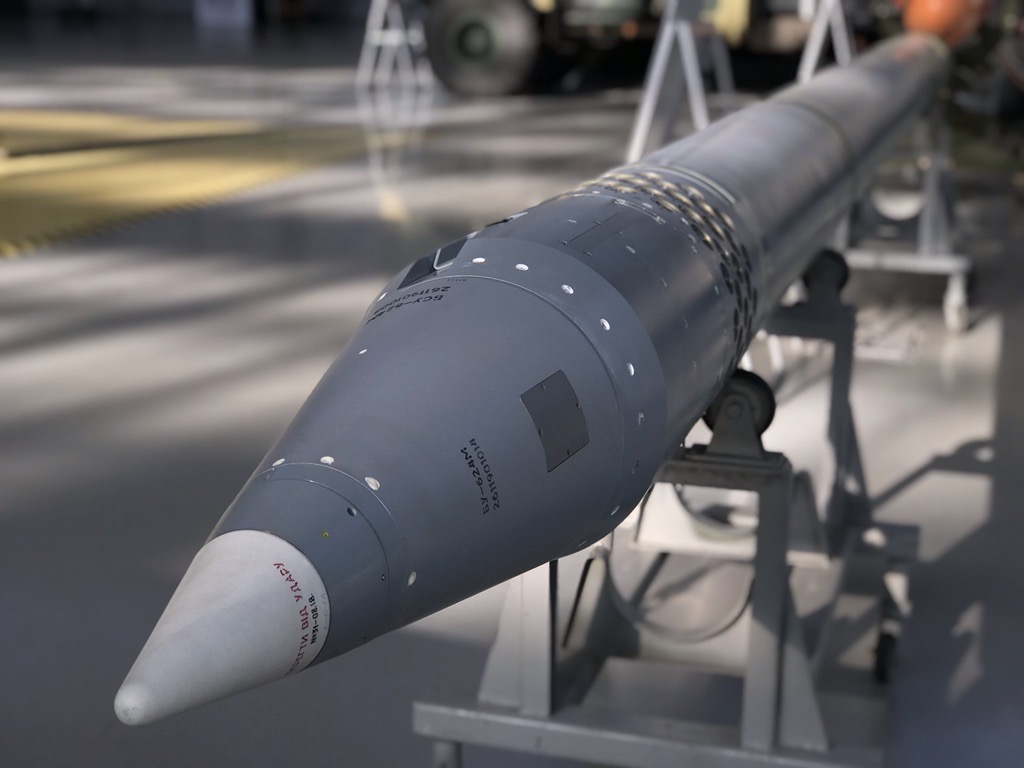

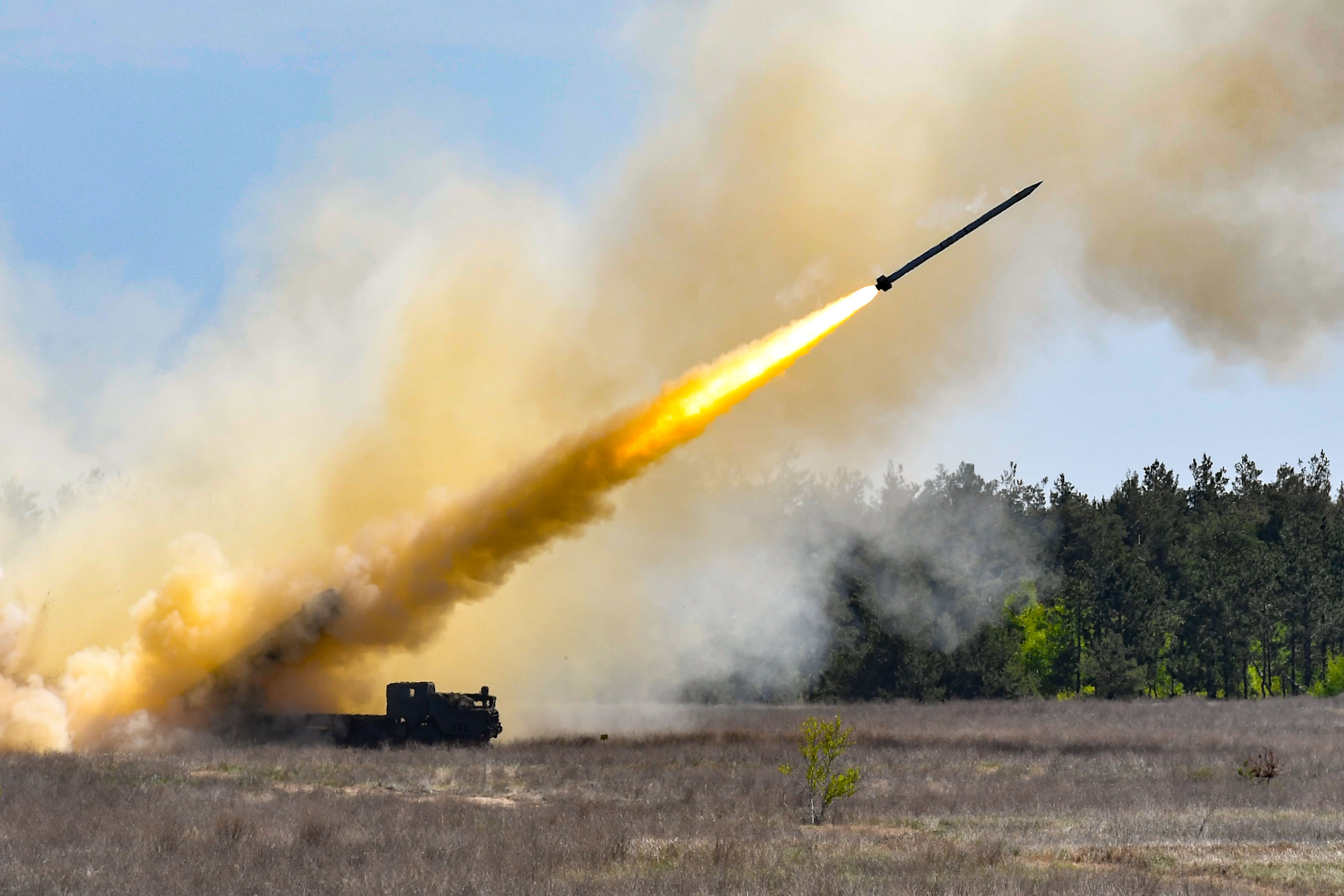

== See also ==
- Hrim-2
- R-360 Neptune
