= BM-30 Smerch =

Soviet/Russian multiple launch rocket system

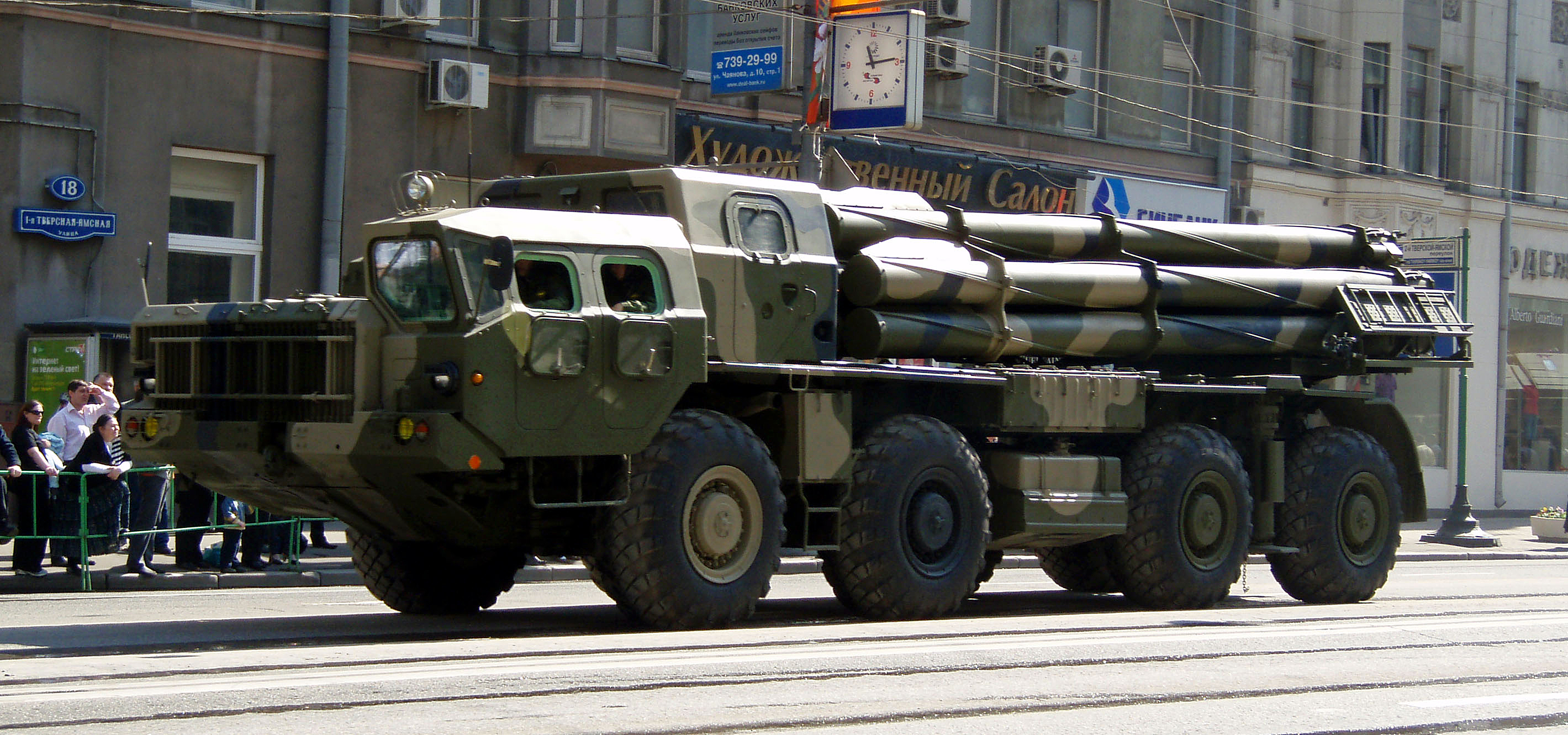
- 9A52-2 "Smerch" launch vehicle
- Type: Multiple rocket launcher
- Place of origin: Soviet Union, Russia

Service history
- In service: 1989–present
- Used by: See § Operators
- Wars: Second Chechen War; War in Donbas; Syrian Civil War; Second Nagorno-Karabakh War; Russo-Ukrainian war

Production history
- Designer: Splav State Research and Production Enterprise
- Designed: 1980s
- Manufacturer: Splav State Research and Production Enterprise
- Produced: 1989–present
- Variants: See Variants

Specifications
- Mass: 43.7 t
- Length: 12 m (39 ft 4 in)
- Width: 3.05 m (10 ft)
- Height: 3.05 m (10 ft)
- Crew: 3
- Caliber: 300 mm
- Barrels: 12
- Maximum firing range: 120 km (75 mi) (9M542 rocket); 200 km (120 mi) (9M544 rocket)
- Main armament: 9M55 or 9M528 rockets
- Engine: D12A-525A V12 diesel engine 525 hp (391 kW)
- Suspension: 8×8 wheeled
- Operational range: 850 km (530 mi)
- Maximum speed: 60 km/h (37 mph)

The BM-30 Smerch (Russian: Смерч, lit. 'tornado', 'whirlwind'), 9K58 Smerch or 9A52-2 Smerch-M is a heavy self-propelled 300 mm multiple rocket launcher designed in the Soviet Union to fire a full load of 12 solid-fuelled projectiles. The system is intended to defeat personnel, armored, and soft targets in concentration areas, artillery batteries, command posts and ammunition depots. It was designed in the early 1980s and entered service in the Soviet Army in 1989. When first observed by the West in 1983, it received the code MRL 280mm M1983. It continues in use by Russia; a program to replace it with the Tornado-S began in 2018.

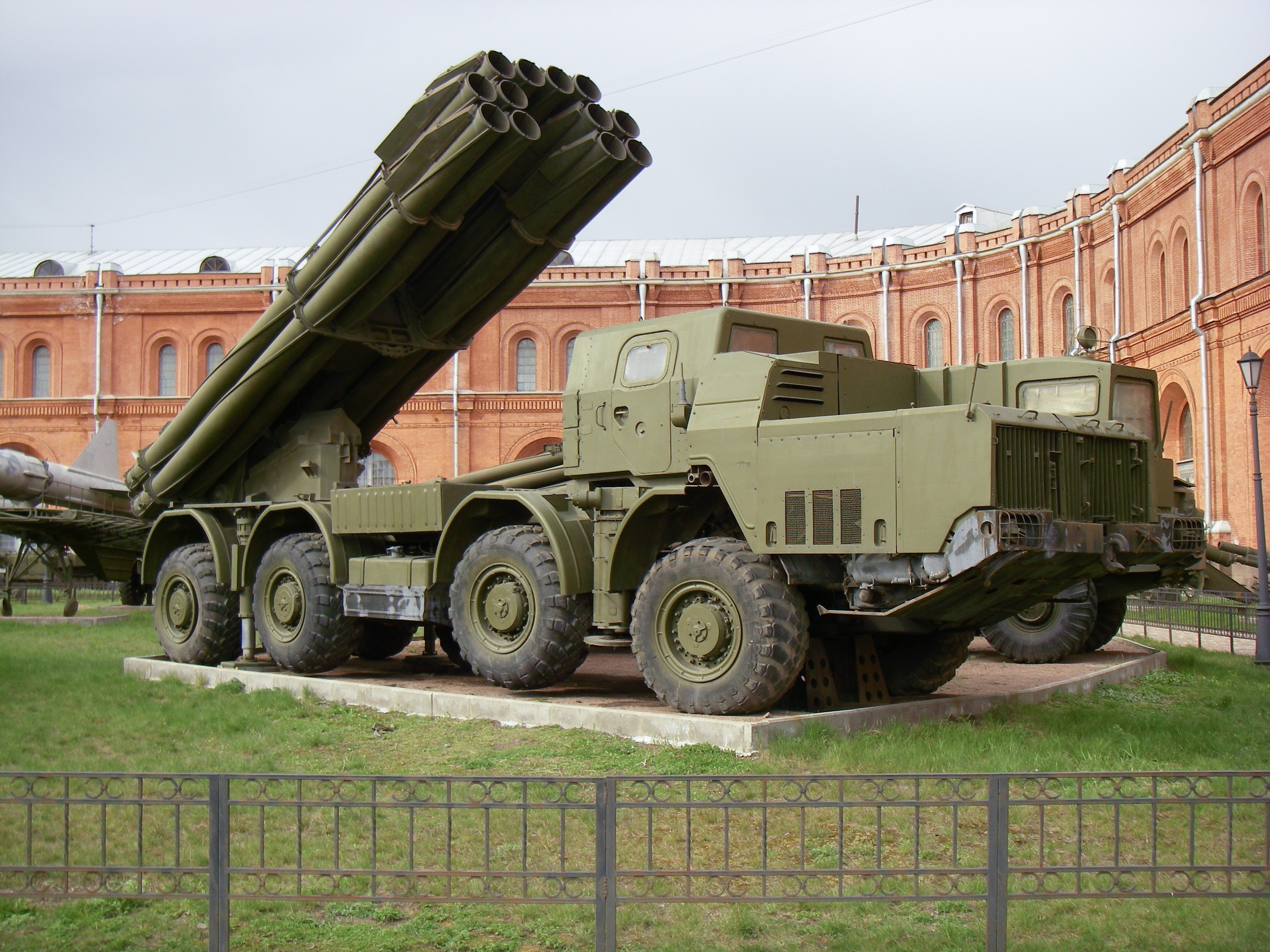
9K58 «Smerch» in Saint-Petersburg Artillery museum

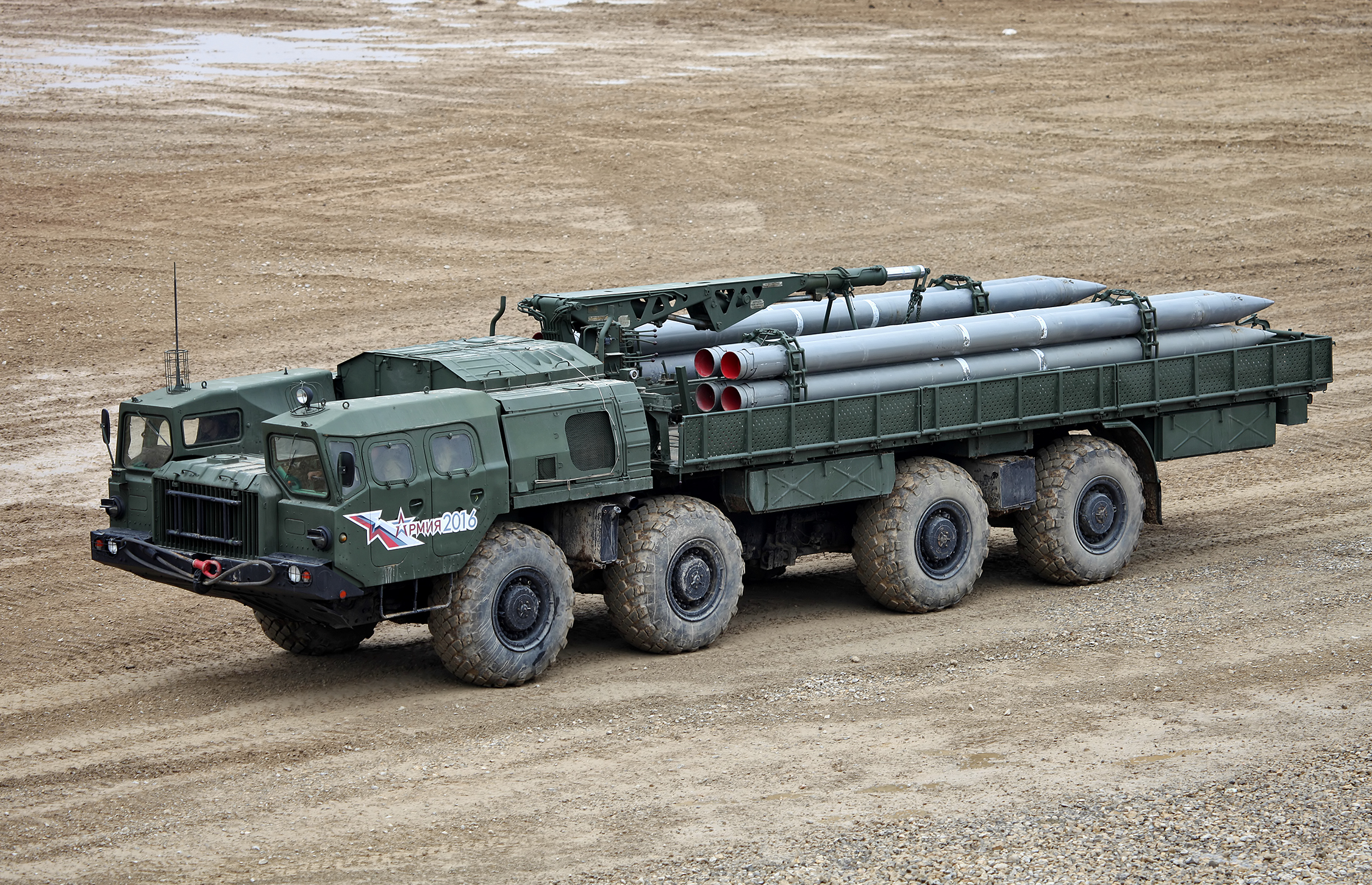
9T234-2 transporter-loader of 9K58

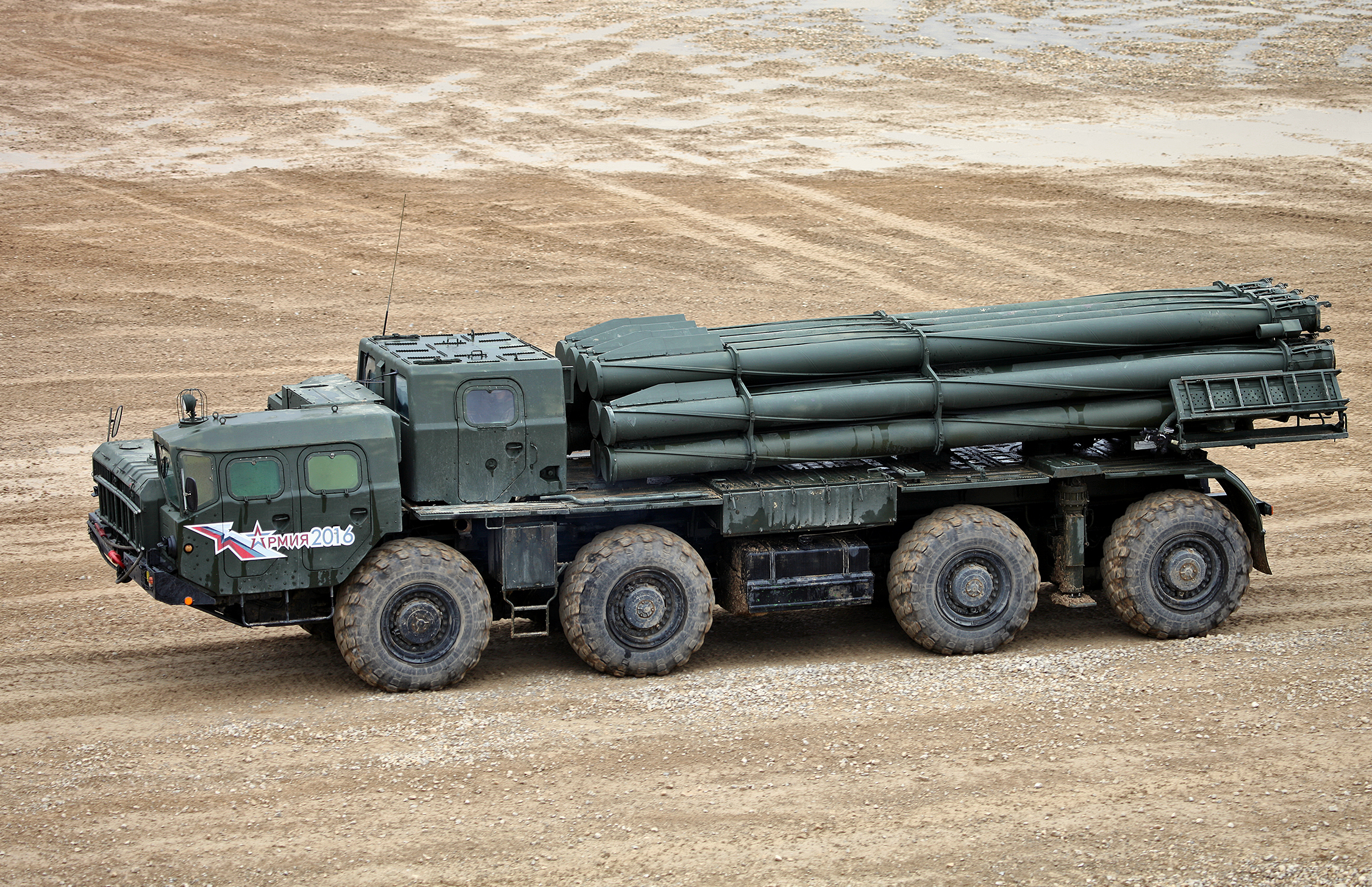
9A52-2 launch vehicle of 9K58 / BM-30 Smerch MLRS

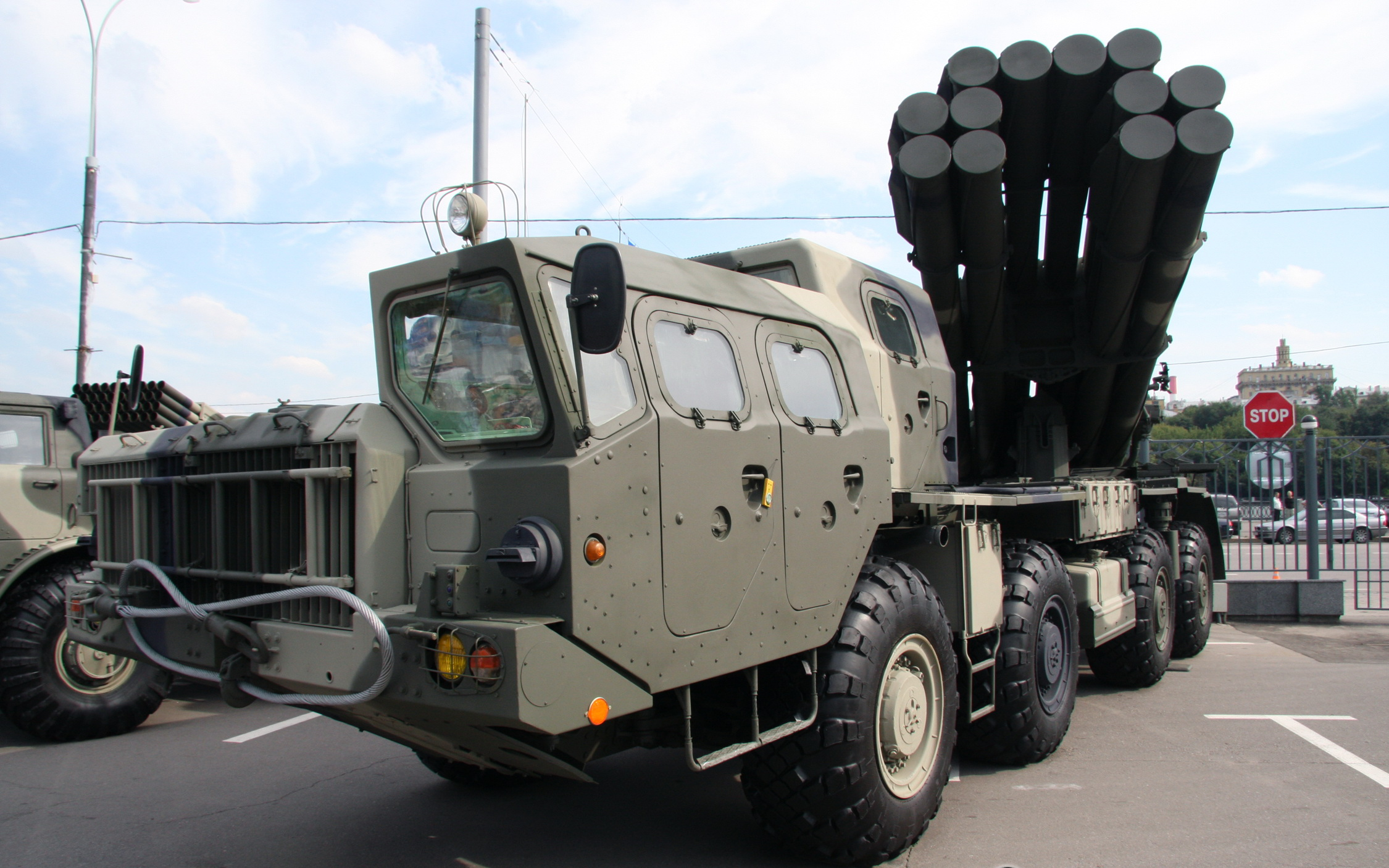
9K58 Smerch (IDELF-2008 – Ministry of Defence of Russia exposition)

== Operational history ==
The first confirmed combat uses of the Smerch were in two war zones in 2014. Syrian military forces used the system against rebel forces during the Syrian civil war, including in fighting in Jobar. It was also used by Russia-backed militants to deliver explosive and cluster munitions to Ukrainian military positions and likewise by the Ukrainian Army. Several have been seen in use by pro-Russian rebels. The Russian Ground Forces used the BM-30 in Syria in October 2015 during the Russian intervention in Syria.

During the 2020 Nagorno-Karabakh conflict, Armenia and Azerbaijan both targeted each other's territory with Smerch rockets.

As of February, there is visual evidence of four Russian Military BM-30s being destroyed in the Russian invasion of Ukraine. Smerch rockets were fired from Belgorod in the 2022 Russian Invasion of Ukraine. During the Battle of Kharkiv it is alleged that 11 Smerch rockets were fired on 27–28 February alone.

== Components ==
The main components of the RSZO 9K58 "Smerch" system are the following :

- Rockets 9M55 or 9M528 (in containers)
- BM 9A52-2 Launch Vehicle
- TZM 9T234-2 Transloader with an 850 kg crane and 12 spare rockets
- Automated fire control equipment in the Command Post 1K123 Vivary
- Maintenance Vehicle PM-2-70 MTO-V
- Set of arsenal equipment 9F819
- Training facilities 9F827 and 9F840

300mm rockets with a firing range of 70 and 90 km and various warheads have been developed for the Smerch MLRS.

The 9A52-2 vehicle with the automated system ensures :

- Delivery of fire from an un-surveyed fire position;
- Laying of the launch tube cluster with the crew staying in the cabin and without using aiming points;
- Autonomous determination of an azimuth of the launch tube cluster's longitudinal axis;
- Visual representation of graphical information for the launch tube cluster laying, the route of vehicle movement and location as well as a point of destination and direction of movement on the video terminal;
- Increase in MLRS survivability owing to reduced time of staying at a fire position;
- Increased comfort for the laying operator, especially in adverse weather conditions and at night;
- Increased independent operation owing to the navigation and survey equipment, which allows the vehicle to rapidly change fire positions and move autonomously;
- Reduction of the combat crew.

== General characteristics ==
- Chassis: MAZ-543M or MAZ-79111
- Emplacement Time: 3 min
- Displacement Time: 2 min
- Launch Rate
  - Salvo Time: 12 rounds in 38 seconds
- Reload Time: 20 min

== Variants ==
- 9A52 – Standard variant on MAZ-79111 truck.
- 9A52-2 – Modified variant on MAZ-543M truck.
- 9A52-2T – Export version, based on the Tatra T816 10×10 truck.
- 9A52-4 – Lighter, airmobile version on KamAZ-6350 truck with modular 6-round rocket pack. Demonstrated in 2007.
- Arctic version with rockets mounted on DT-30PM tracked vehicle.
- 9A54 – Tornado-S, upgraded with a GLONASS receiver and automated digital FCS.

== Rocket projectiles ==
Variant		Rocket		Warhead			Guidance system	Range	
Name	Type	Weight	Length	Weight	Submunition	Self-destruct time	Guidance system	Min. (km)	Max. (km)
9M55K	Cluster munition, anti-personnel	800 kg	7.6 m	243 kg	72 × 1.75 kg, each with 96 fragments (4.5 g each)	110 sec		20	70
9M55K1	Cluster munition, self-guided anti-tank	800 kg	7.6 m	243 kg	5 × 15 kg			20	70
9M55K4	Cluster munition, AT minelets.	800 kg	7.6 m	243 kg	25 × 5 kg mines	24 hour		20	70
9M55K5	HEAT/HE-Fragmentation.	800 kg	7.6 m	243 kg	646 × 0.25 kg (up to 120 mm RHA armor-piercing)	260 sec		20	70
9M55F	Separable HE-Fragmentation	800 kg	7.6 m	258 kg				20	70
9M55C	Thermobaric	800 kg	7.6 m	243 kg				20	70
9M528	HE-Fragmentation	815 kg	7.6 m	243 kg				25	90
9M534	UAV delivery system	815 kg	7.6 m		Drone			20	90
9М542	HE-Fragmentation, PGM	815 kg	7.6 m	150 kg			Inertial, GLONASS, 4 canards	40	120
R624	HE-Fragmentation, PGM		7.6 m	250 kg			Inertial, GPS, 90 pulse engines		70
R624M	HE-Fragmentation, PGM		7.6 m	170 kg			Inertial, GPS, 90 pulse engines		130

BM-30 Smerch ammunition: 9M55K and 9M55F

== Operators ==
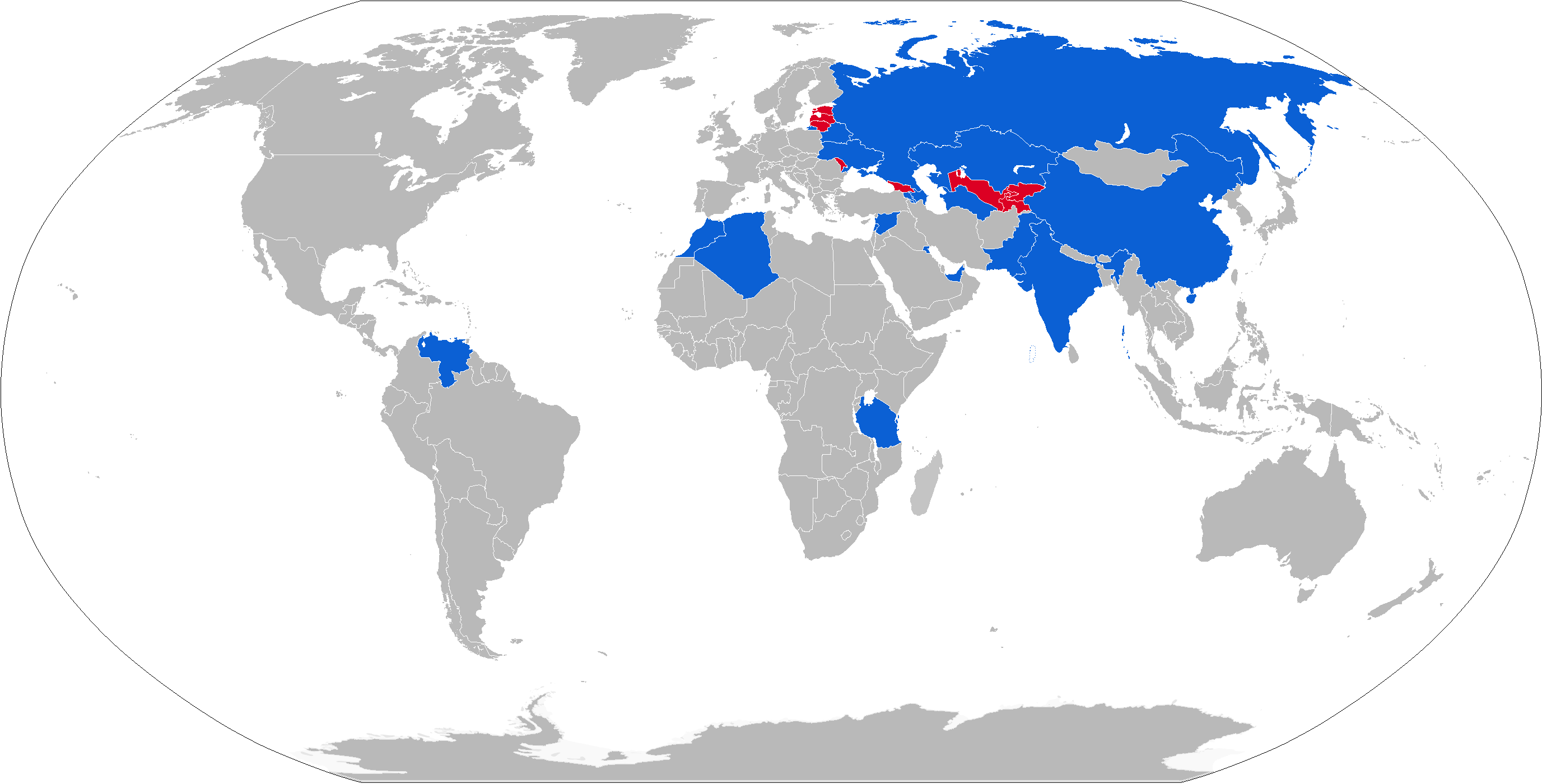
Operators Current Former

=== Current operators ===
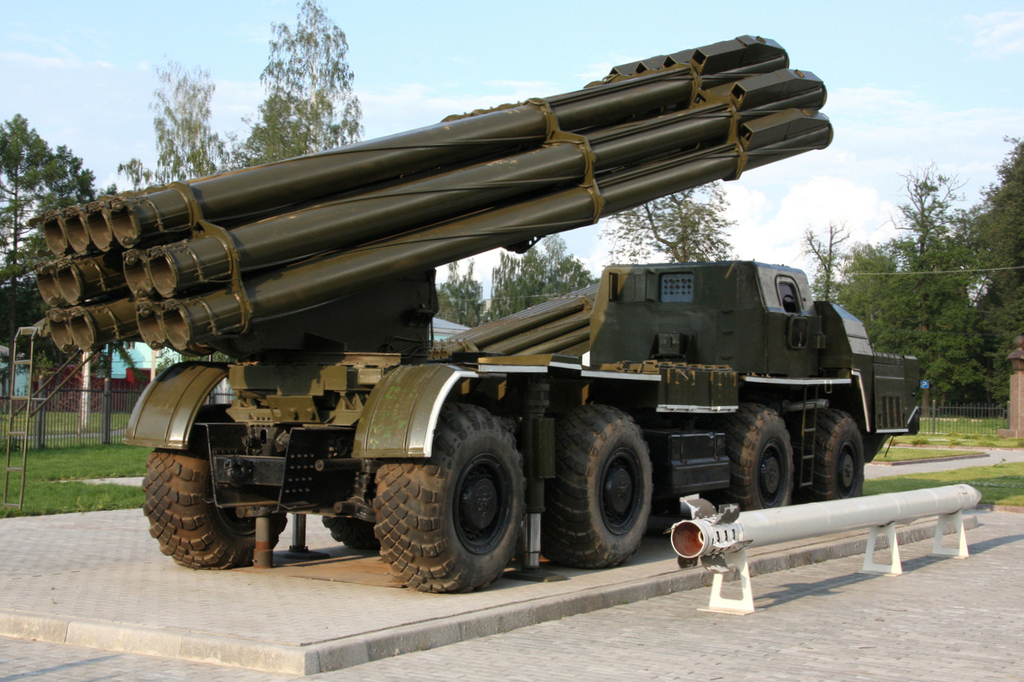
BM-30 Smerch with projectile as a monument to A.N. Ganichev in Tula city

- Algeria – 18 BM-30s received from Russia in 1999. All in service as of 2024.
- Armenia – 6 purchased from Russia and received in 2017-18. All in service as of 2024.
- Azerbaijan – 50 BM-30 Smerch and 10 Polonez in service as of 2024.
- Belarus – 36 BM-30 Smerch and 10 Polonez/Polonez-M in service as of 2024.
- India – Total 42 9A52-2T launchers in service as of 2024 (3 regiments). The first deal, worth $450 million, to equip 2 artillery regiments (28 launchers) was signed in December 2005. Deliveries were completed by March 2008.
- Kazakhstan – 6 in service as of 2024.
- Kuwait – 27 systems in service as of 2024.
- Libya - Several seen in a military parade in Benghazi in 2025 (in service of the Libyan National Army).
- Russia – 50 BM-30 Smerch and 20 Tornado-S in service as of February 2025. At least 6 BM-30 have been lost in the Russian Invasion of Ukraine as of 31 March 2026.
- Syria – Unknown number in service. Used in the Syrian civil war. 2 BM-30 Smerchs were captured by HTS rebel forces in the 2024 Syrian rebel offensive.
- Turkmenistan – 6 systems in service as of 2024.
- Ukraine – 40 BM-30 Smerch and some Vilkha as of 2024. Serviceability is doubtful.
- United Arab Emirates – 6 systems in service as of 2024.
- Venezuela – 12 systems in service as of 2024.

=== Former operators ===
- Soviet Union: Passed on to successor states.
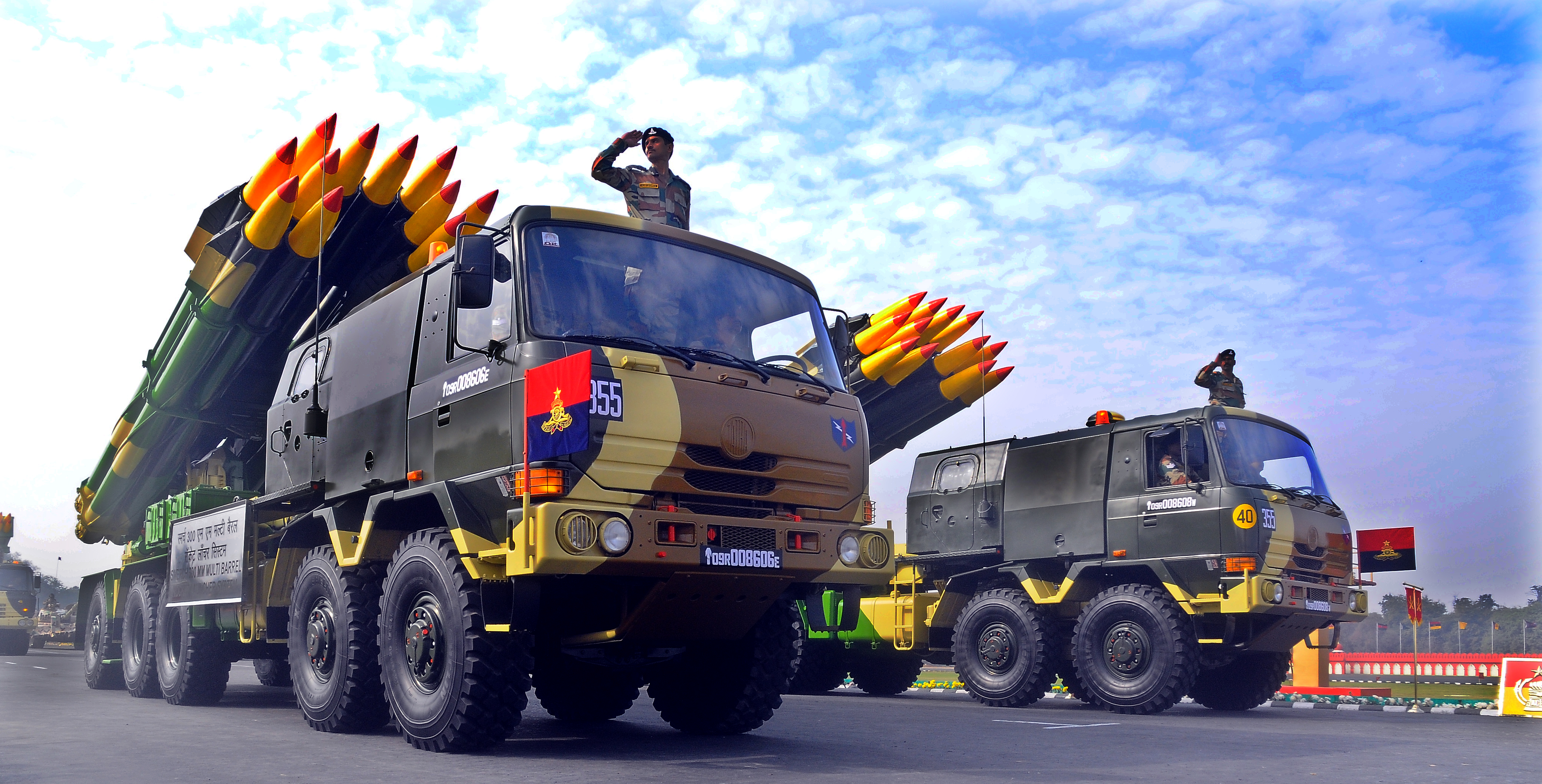
Indian BM-30 Smerch launchers on Indian built Tatra 816 trucks during a military parade

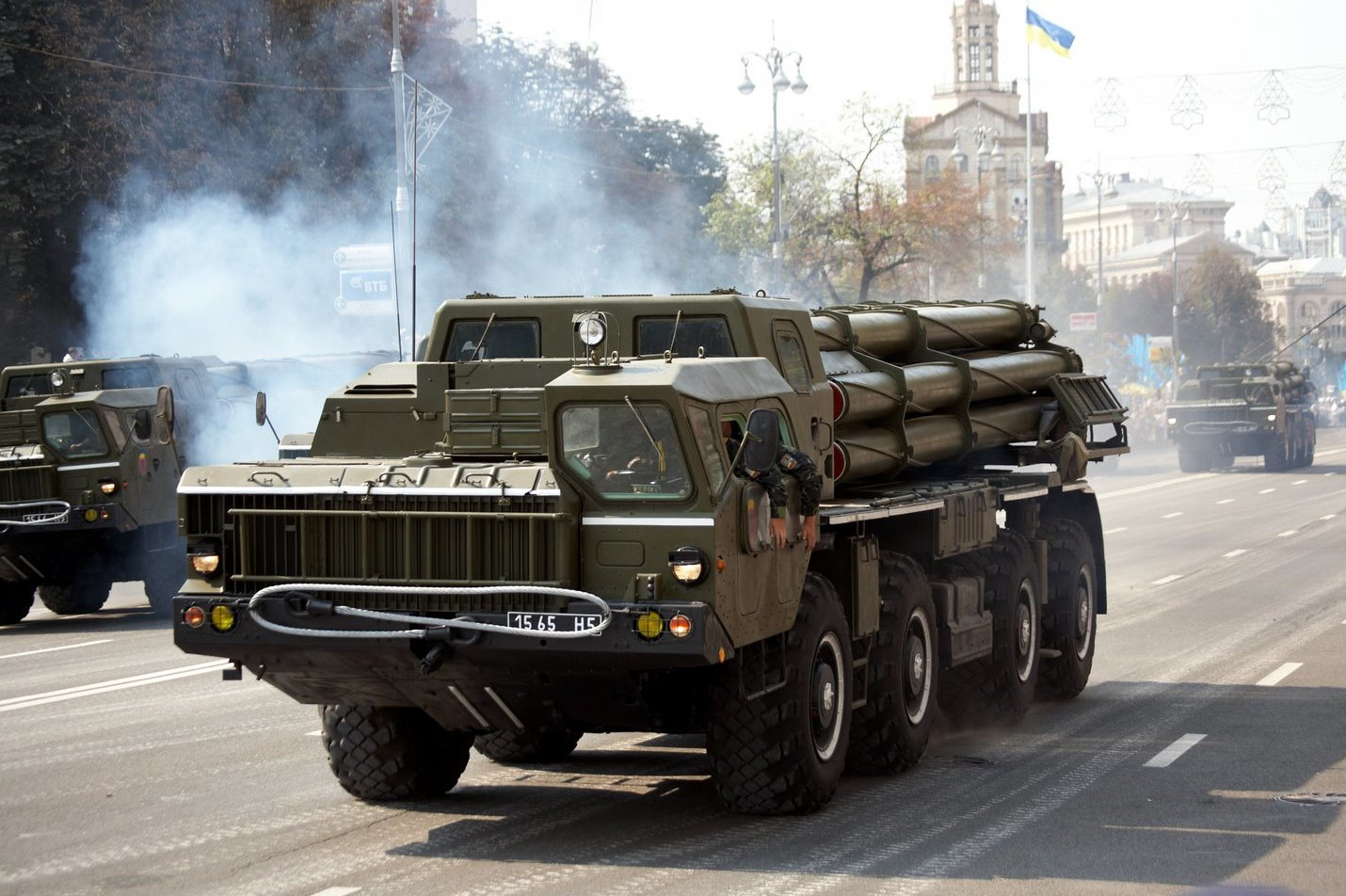
Ukrainian BM-30 Smerch launchers during a military parade

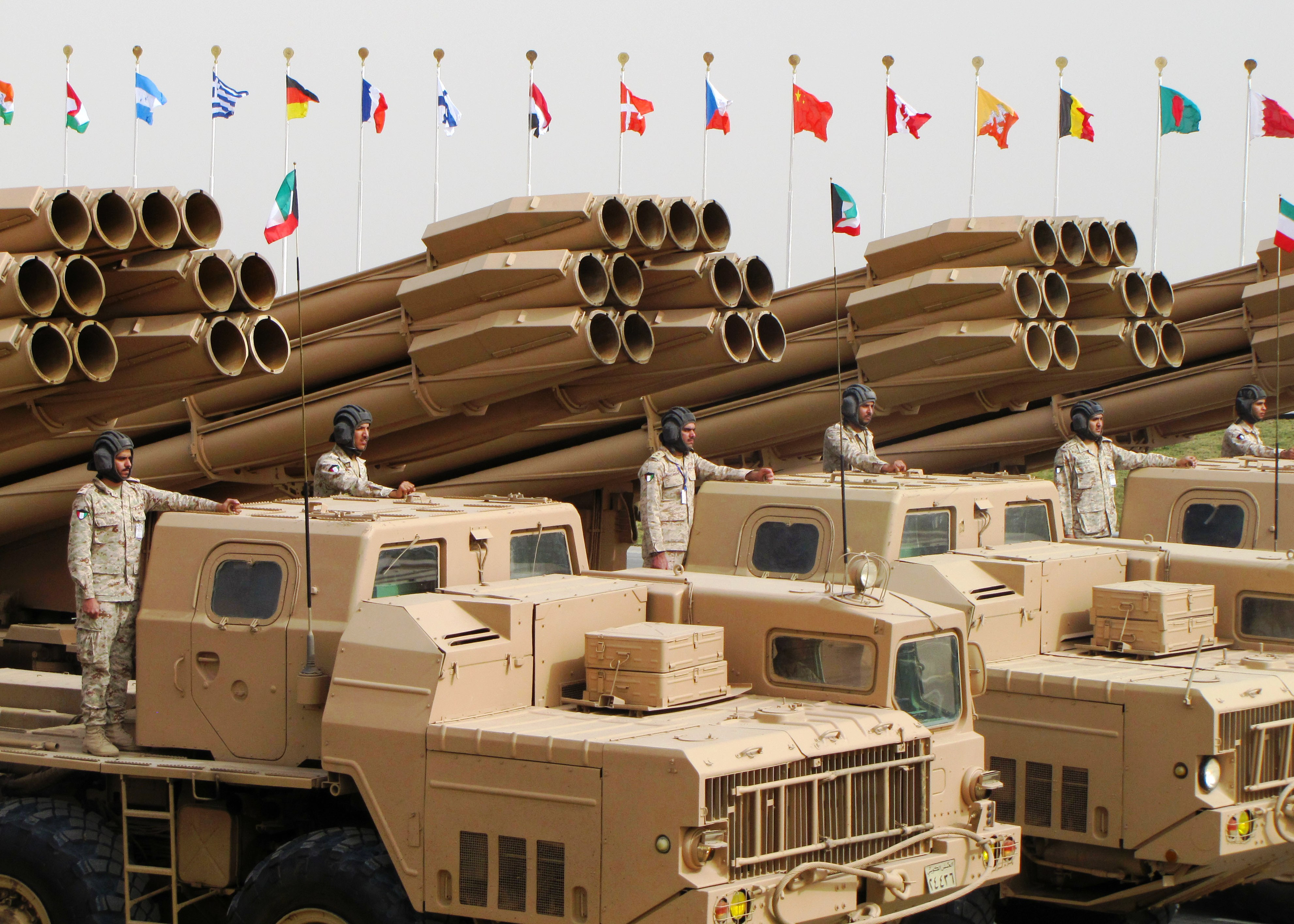
Kuwaiti BM-30 Smerch launchers during a military parade in Kuwait

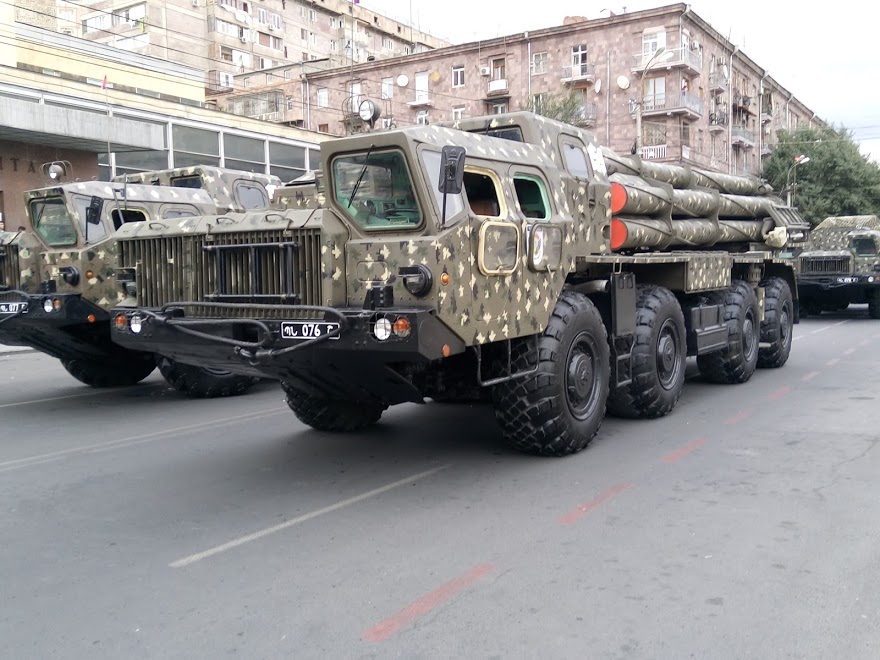
Armenian BM-30 Smerch launchers during a military parade in Yerevan, 2016

== Similar systems ==
- PHL-96 – Visually similar missile based on the Wanshan WS-2400 8x8 cross country truck. However, the PHL-03 and BM-30 do not share interchangeable parts, so they are distinct missiles despite their similar appearance. The Chinese vehicle utilizes a German-designed diesel engine, transmission and hydraulics, manufactured by Wanshan in China, following a technology transfer from ZF Friedrichshafen. The program began in the late 1990s, with the '96' in the designation reportedly meaning 1996, the year that the Chinese military first issued the requirement for a new long-range SPMRLS. The program went through major redesign changes when the BM-30 Smerch was purchased. Although dubbed by many Chinese as a guided self-propelled multiple rocket launching system (SPMRLS), the PHL96 is not strictly speaking a guided SPMRLS because, technically, none of rockets are guided – the guidance is actually achieved via the sub-munitions, such as the 9M55K1 cluster munition. Only a very limited number of the PHL96 entered Chinese service because its successor, the PHL03, entered service shortly after.

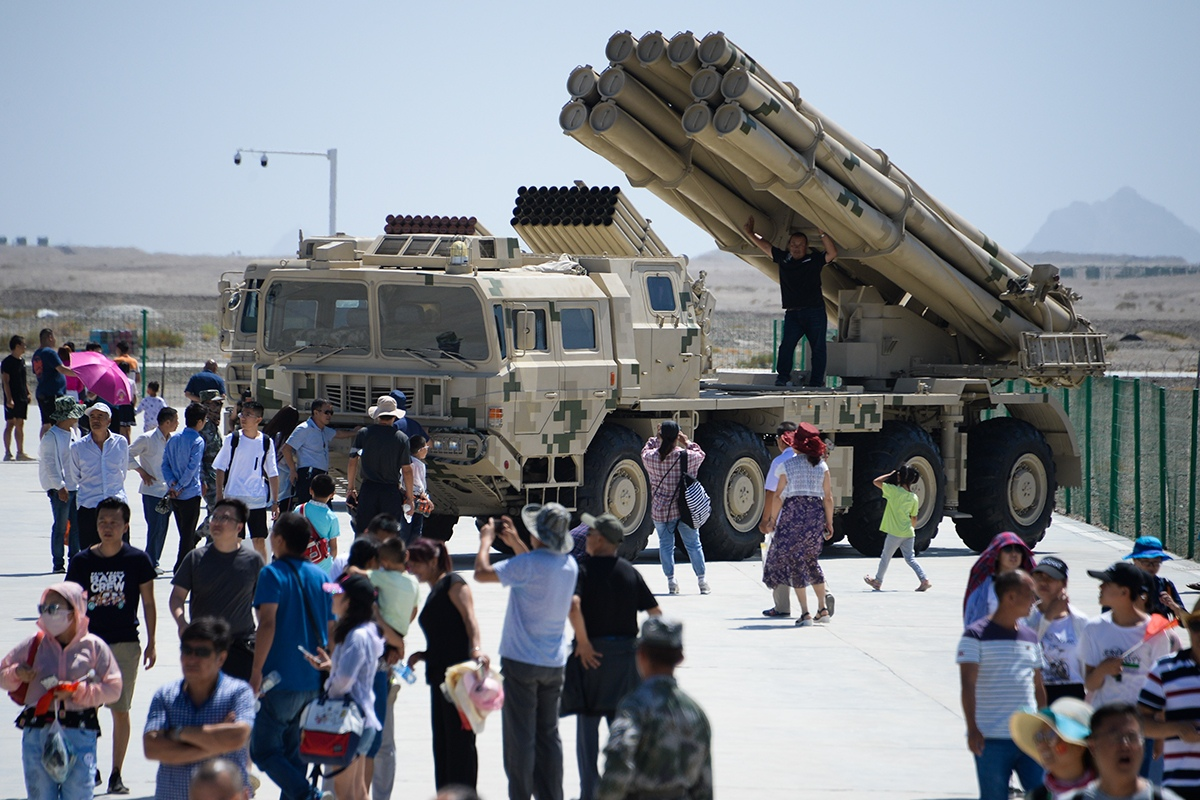
PHL-03 heavy multiple rocket launcher.

- PHL-03 – Chinese development of the PHL96 with 150 km range. The PHL03 is a highly digitized PHL96 with a computerized fire control system (FCS) incorporating GPS/GLONASS, similar to that of the Type 90A SPMRL, with a four-man crew (compared with three for the BM-30/PHL96), which entered service around 2004–2005, only a year or two after its predecessor, the PHL96. As with the PHL96, the PHL03 is not exactly a guided SPMRL because it is the submunitions that are guided, not the rockets themselves.
- Vilkha - A Ukrainian development of the Smerch system that entered service in 2018 with the Ukrainian Rocket Forces.

== See also ==
- Astros II – (Brazil)
- Katyusha – (Soviet Union), BM-13 of World War II
- BM-24 – (Soviet Union), 240 mm
- BM-27 Uragan – (Soviet Union), 220 mm
- Fajr-5 – (Iran), 333 mm
- M142 HIMARS – (United States)
- M270 – (United States)
- Pinaka multi-barrel rocket launcher – (India), 214 mm
- TOROS – (Turkey), 230–260 mm
- TOS-1 Buratino – (Soviet Union, Russia), Heavy Flame Thrower System (multiple rocket / thermobaric weapon launcher)
- Vilkha – (Ukraine), 300 mm

== Bibliography ==
- Jamie Prenatt and Adam Hook, Katyusha – Russian Multiple Rocket Launchers 1941–Present, New Vanguard 235, Osprey Publishing Ltd, Oxford 2016. ISBN 978 1 4728 1086 1
