= Stugna =

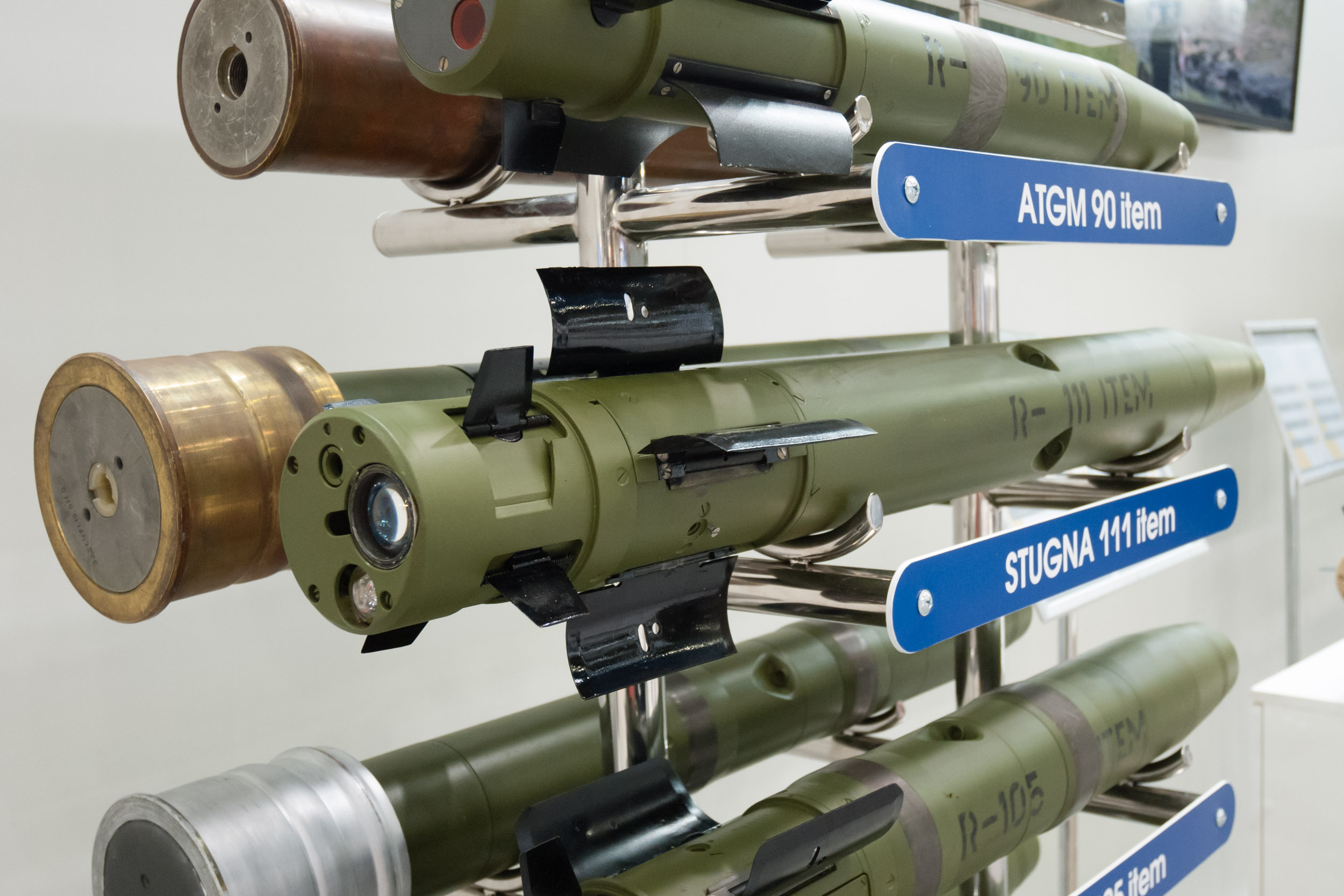
- Type: Gun-launched antitank guided missile
- Place of origin: Ukraine

Production history
- Designer: Luch Design Bureau
- Manufacturer: Artem

Specifications
- Mass: 24.5 kg

Stugna (Ukrainian: Стугна, romanized: Stuhna) is a gun-launched antitank guided missile (ATGM) designed to be launched from a 100-mm antitank gun like the MT-12 Rapira or the main gun of a T-55 tank.

The Stugna gun-launched missile should not be confused with the Stugna-P portable missile system, also called Skif.
