= Skif (anti-tank guided missile) =

Ukrainian antitank guided missile system, Export version of Stugna-P

Skif (Stugna-P)
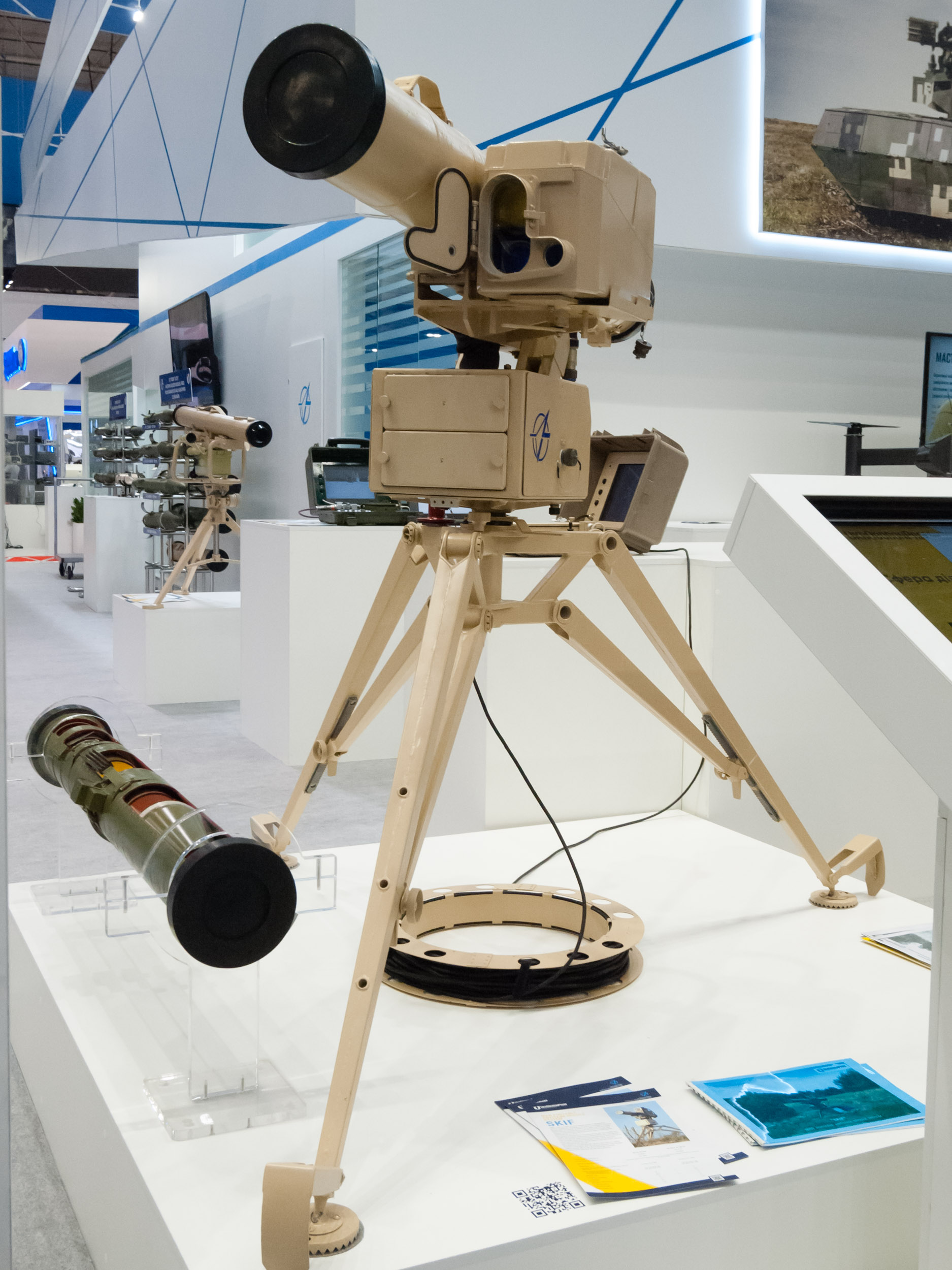
- A Skif on a tripod.
- Type: ATGM
- Place of origin: Ukraine

Service history
- In service: 2011–present
- Used by: See Users
- Wars: War in Donbas; Russian invasion of Ukraine

Production history
- Designer: Kyiv Design Bureau "Luch", OJSC Peleng
- Variants: See Variants

Specifications
- Mass: 97 kg (214 lb); full system including missile 104 kg (229 lb)
- Diameter: 130 mm, 152 mm
- Detonation mechanism: Impact fuze
- Operational range: Day: 5/5.5 km; Night: 3 km
- Guidance system: Laser beam riding with target tracking in TV or thermal imaging channels in manual or auto mode
- Steering system: Manual or automatic
- Launch platform: Tripod, vehicle mount on remote weapon station (RWS)

The Skif, also known as the Stugna-P or Stuhna-P, is a Ukrainian anti-tank guided missile (ATGM) system developed in the early 2010s by the Luch Design Bureau, a unit of UkrOboronProm. The initial guidance device PN-S (ПН-С) of the Skif was developed and manufactured by Belarusian design bureau Peleng based in Minsk.

The Skif is designed to destroy modern armored targets with combined carried or monolithic armor, including explosive reactive armor (ERA). The Skif can attack both stationary and moving targets. It can be used to attack from both long range (up to 5 kilometres [3.1 mi] in the daytime) and close range (100 metres; 330 ft). It can attack point targets such as weapon emplacements, lightly armored objects, and hovering helicopters. The Skif has two targeting modes: manually steered, and automated fire-and-forget that uses no manual tracking of a target. In 2018, an upgraded export variant of the Skif was tested by the Ukrainian military.

The Skif ATGM system should not be confused with the Stugna 100-mm gun-launched anti-tank missile.

== Etymology and spelling ==
Skif (Ukrainian: скіф) is the Ukrainian word for Scythian. The name Stugna-P (Russian) or Stuhna-P (Ukrainian: Стугна-П) is after the river Stuhna, a right tributary of the Dnipro.

== Design ==
The Skif consists of a tripod, PDU-215 remote control panel, guidance device, and thermographic camera (thermal imager). Each round of ammunition comes in its own canister of either 130 or 152 mm diameter.

The PDU-215 control panel is a briefcase-like laptop computer with a control panel, holding a small joystick and a flat-panel display, that is connected to the firing unit by a cable, allowing it be used at distances up to 50 metres (160 ft) away. Two firing modes are available: manual, and fire-and-forget. Fire-and-forget provides automatic control of the missile flight using a targeting laser beam.

A three to four-person team is optimal for deploying the Skif. Operators require specially-made backpacks. Once the missile is fired, the operator controls the Skif and corrects the aim when needed, by using the joystick on the remote control. The Skif's system has a shelf life of 15 years. The missiles have a 10-year shelf life.

The system comes complete with 130 mm and 152 mm caliber missiles in transport and launching containers. Tandem charge high-explosive anti-tank (HEAT) RK-2S warheads might be able to counter medium weight main battle tanks such as the T-90A with penetration of 800 millimetres (31 in) behind ERA. RK-2M-K warheads might be able to counter heavy main battle tanks such as M1A2 Abrams with their penetration of 1,100 millimetres (43 in) behind ERA. The system also includes high explosive (HE) fragmentation RK-2OF and RK-2М-OF warheads to attack infantry positions and light armored vehicles. The system can use all four types of missiles with no modification. The system's thermal imager can be used during night operations. According to a 2014 article, SLX-Hawk thermal imaging camera produced by Selex ES can be installed for use at night and in poor visibility conditions. The Ukrainian military only uses the 130 mm caliber missiles, as the 152 mm versions were made to compete against the Russian Kornet-EM on the export market.

The upgraded Skif-M was unveiled in 2022, which has improvements such as a lighter tripod, a revised traverse and elevation housing, a new lightweight remote-control panel, new batteries to power the launcher and panel, and the new PN-U sighting and guidance unit (SGU) which includes a laser rangefinder. The Luch Design Bureau said the Skif-M had been delivered to the Ukrainian armed forces in September 2023.

== Variants ==
The launcher can fire three types of ammunition, with two different calibers.

=== 130 mm missiles ===
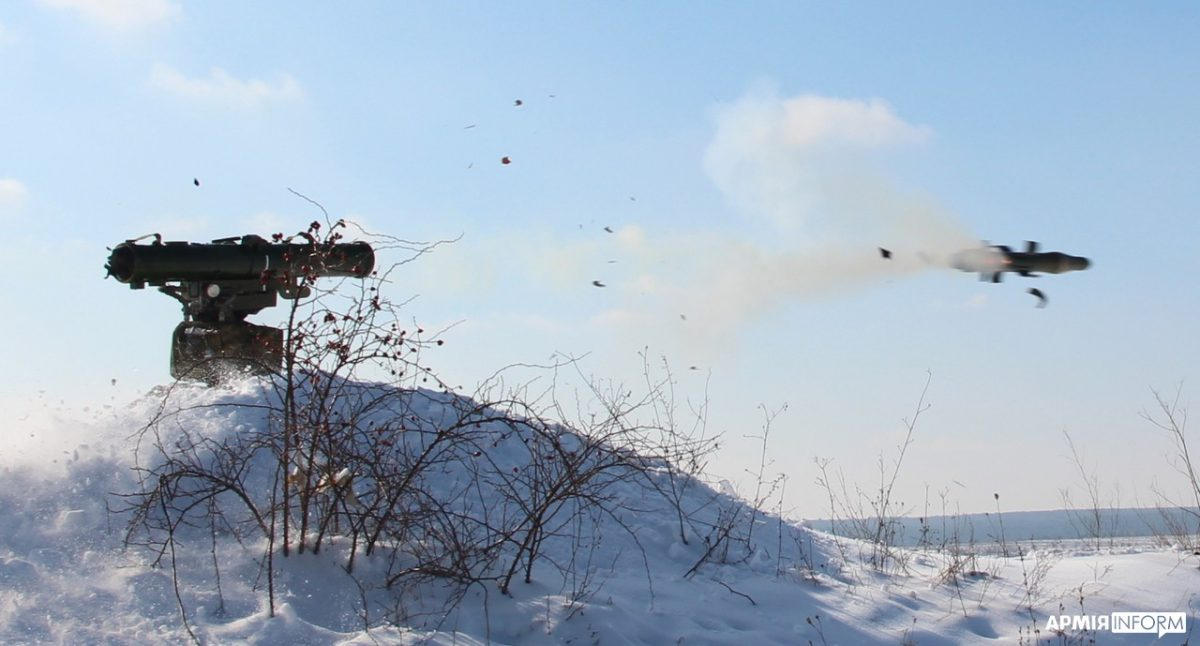
Skif firing from a concealed position by remote control

System configuration with 130 mm missiles using RK-2S and RK-2OF warheads.

- Missile caliber: 130 mm
- Firing range (day): 100–5,000 metres (110–5,470 yd)
- Firing range (night): 100–3,000 metres (110–3,280 yd)
- Full system weight: 97 kilograms (214 lb)
- Missile in container weight: 30 kilograms (66 lb)
- Warhead penetration:
  - RK-2S tandem-charge HEAT: Not less than 1,000 millimetres (39 in) RHA behind ERA
  - RK-2OF HE-fragmentation: Not less than 60 millimetres (2.4 in) RHA with at least 600 fragments
- Container length: 1,360 millimetres (54 in)

=== 152 mm missiles ===
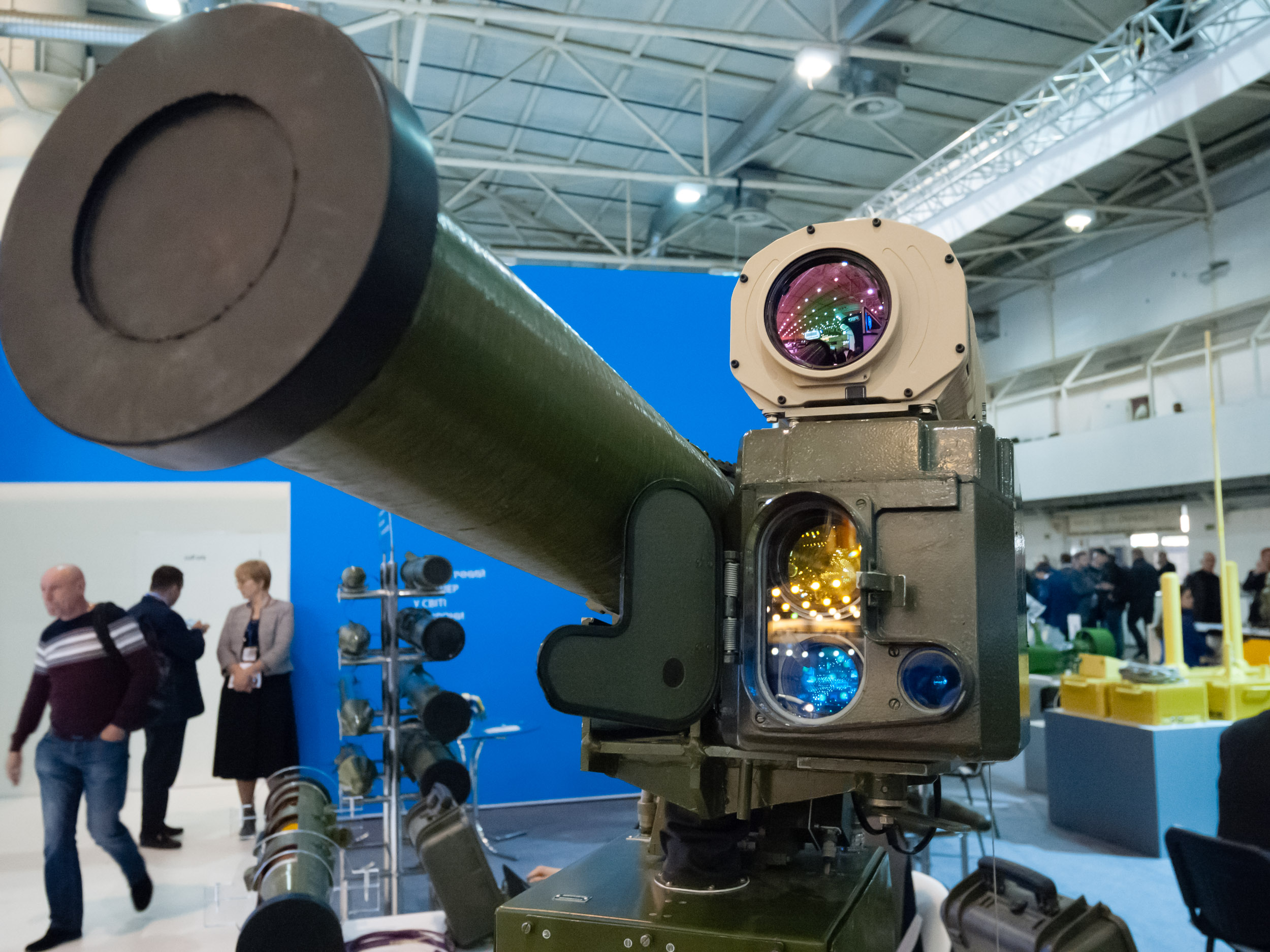
Skif and Aselsan Eye-LR-S thermal imaging camera

System configuration with 152 mm missiles using RK-2M-K and RK-2М-OF warheads:

- Missile caliber: 152 mm
- Firing range (day): 100–5,500 metres (110–6,010 yd)
- Firing range (night): 100–3,000 metres (110–3,280 yd)
- Full system weight: 104 kilograms (229 lb)
- Missile in container weight: 37 kilograms (82 lb)
- Warhead penetration:
  - RK-2M-K tandem-charge HEAT: Not less than 1,200 millimetres (47 in) RHA behind ERA
  - RK-2М-OF HE-fragmentation: Not less than 120 millimetres (4.7 in) RHA with at least 1000 fragments
- Container length: 1,360 millimetres (54 in)

=== SERDAR ===
SERDAR is a stabilized remote controlled weapon station (RCWS). The system was developed jointly by the Luch Design Bureau, Turkish company Aselsan, and SpetsTechnoExport, part of Ukraine's Ukroboronprom enterprise. The system carries two (in some versions four) 130 mm or 152 mm missiles with RK-2S or RK-2M-K tandem-charge HEAT warheads. The system is also equipped with 12.7 mm and 7.62 mm caliber machine guns. A joint company for the production of Skif missiles was established in Turkey and production began in early 2020.

=== Shershen ===
Shershen is a Belarusian ATGM based on Skif. It also has different types of 130 mm and 152 mm missiles.

== Operational history ==
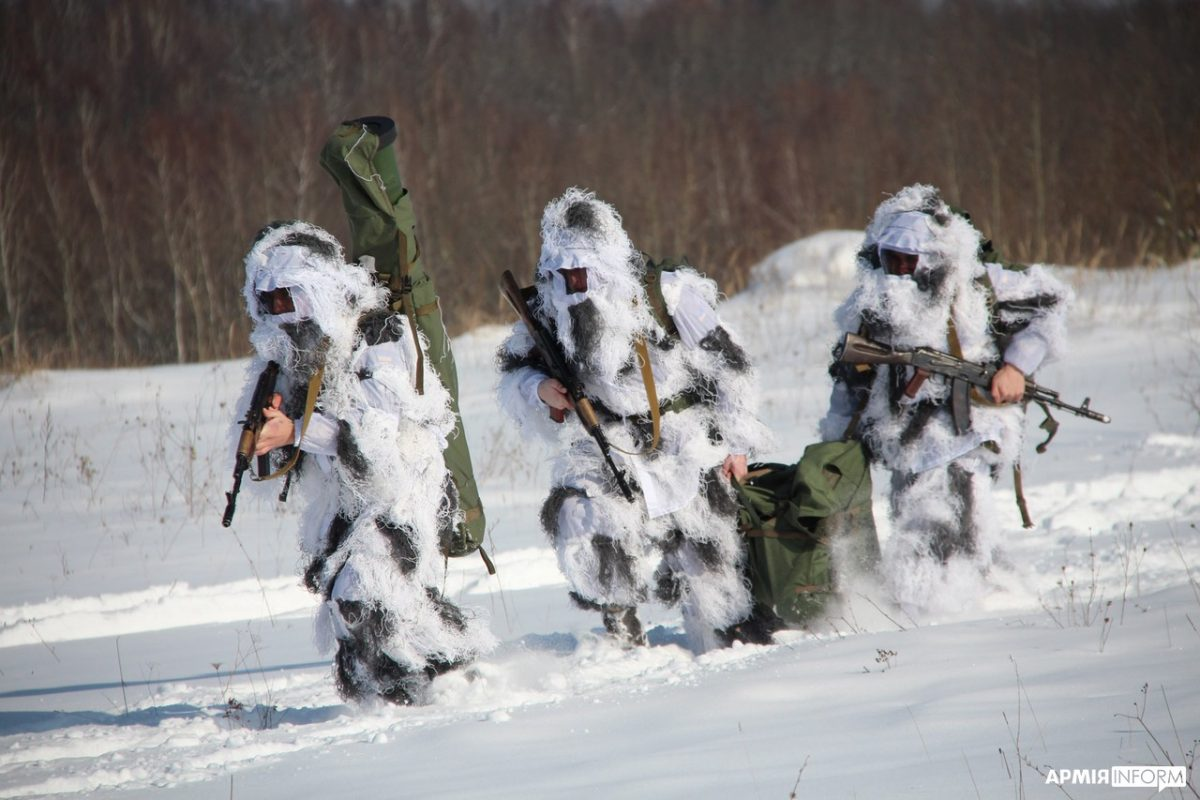
A Ukrainian three-man anti-tank team moving on foot in a winter maneuver, carrying Skif ATGM

The missile system was used during the pre-2022 Russo-Ukrainian War by Ukrainian forces following first deliveries in 2018. However, it gained wider prominence against Russian Army forces during the 2022 Russian invasion of Ukraine beginning in February alongside anti-tank systems provided by NATO countries such as the FGM-148 Javelin (US) and NLAW (UK/Sweden). On April 5, 2022, Ukrainian forces used the missile system to down a Russian Kamov Ka-52 attack helicopter. Although not as advanced as fire and forget systems such as the Javelin, the Stugna-P possesses a few unique advantages over those weapons. It possesses a longer range overall, flies significantly faster, and is harder to jam due to its SACLOS laser guidance. However, it weighs significantly more than those weapons and cannot be operated by a lone operator.

As the war has moved to the Donbas and fighting has changed from wooded areas to open plains, the missile has been fitted to light vehicles to make it mobile. The Skif is being used in the same way US forces used the TOW missile system in the 1980s and the Gulf War Desert Patrol Vehicle. On 25 April, near Izyum, during one engagement four tanks were destroyed or damaged in 4 minutes by the same Skif operator.

Many of the missiles were to be exported to Middle Eastern countries. However, upon the outbreak of war these export models were used by Ukrainian soldiers.

According to Ukrainian soldiers, one missile has hit a Russian tank at 5,300 meters (300 m beyond the nominal maximum range of 5 km).

== Users ==
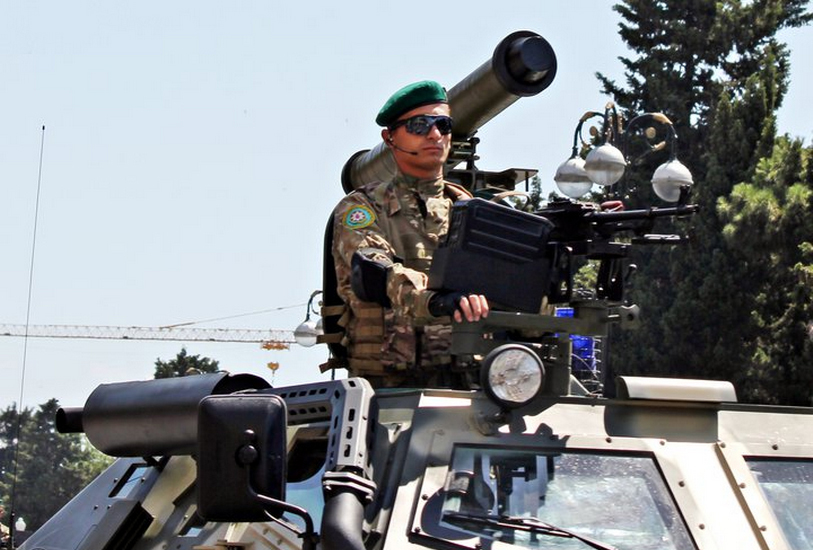
Armored car Otokar Cobra of the Azerbaijani army, equipped with a Skif ATGM

- Azerbaijan
- Algeria
- Saudi Arabia
- Myanmar
- Georgia
- Ukraine
- Morocco
- Qatar
- Egypt
- Jordan

== See also ==
- RK-3 Corsar – (Ukraine)
- Shershen – (Belarus)
- 9M133 Kornet – (Russia)
- OMTAS – (Turkey)
