= AMZ =

AMZ may refer to:

- Abu Musab al-Zarqawi (1966–2006), referred to as AMZ, a militant Islamist from Jordan who ran a paramilitary training camp in Afghanistan
- Allgemeine musikalische Zeitung, 19th century German music journal
- AMZ-KUTNO Ltd, a Polish automotive company
  - AMZ Dzik, an infantry mobility vehicle
  - AMZ Tur, a light infantry mobility vehicle
  - AMZ Żubr, an infantry mobility vehicle
- Ardmore Airport (New Zealand), IATA: AMZ
- At Mount Zoomer, a 2008 album by Canadian band Wolf Parade
- Australian Milking Zebu, a composite breed of dairy cattle
- ISO 639:amz or Uradhi language, an apparently extinct language from Australia
