= Syrenka (automobile) =

AMZ Syrenka
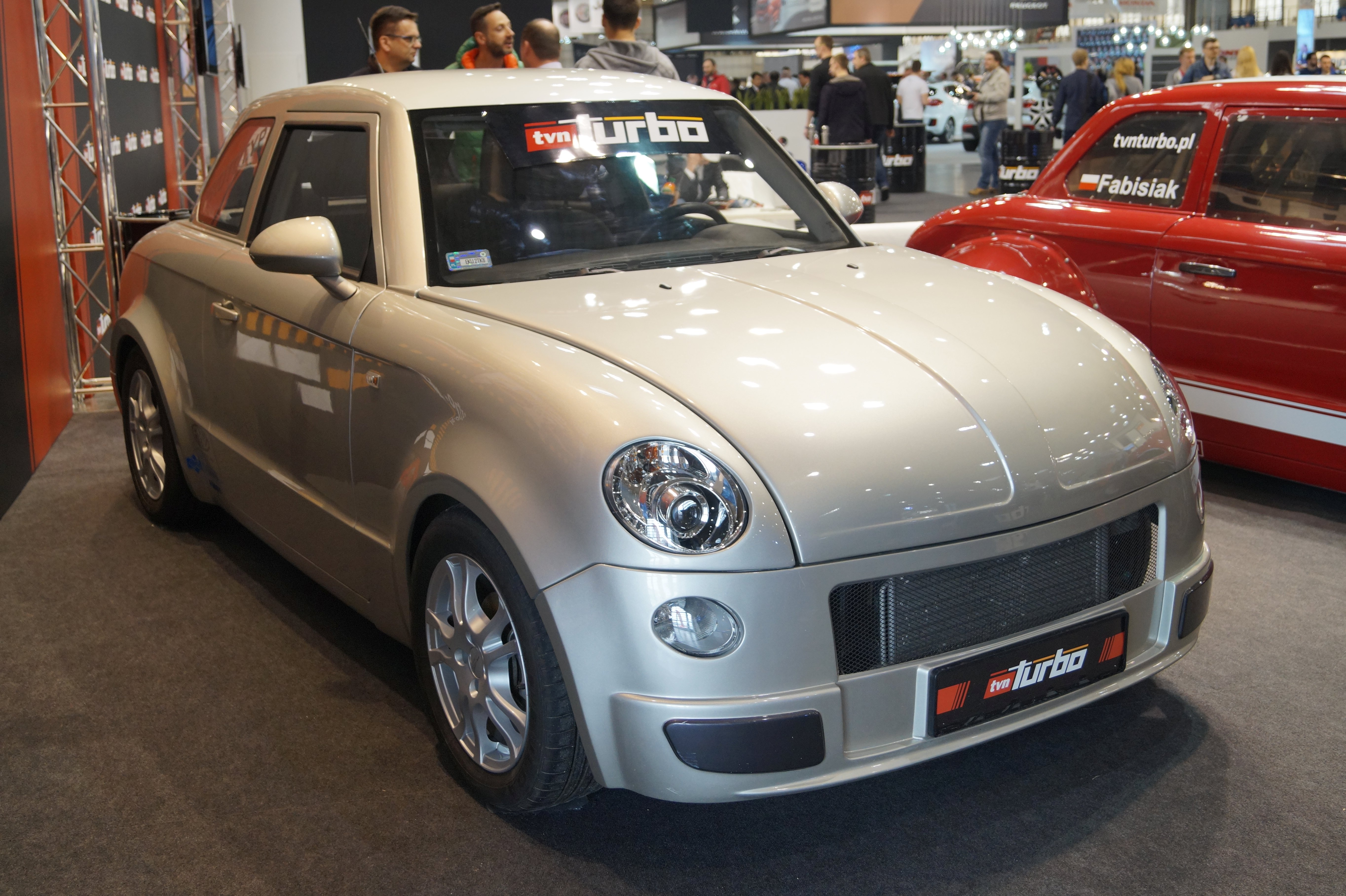
- AMZ Syrenka at the 2016 Poznań Motor Show

Overview
- Type: Concept Car
- Manufacturer: AMZ-Kutno, Polfarmex
- Production: 2014

Body and chassis
- Class: Supermini (B)
- Layout: Front-wheel-drive
- Related: AK Syrena Meluzyna, Vosco S106

The Syrenka is a concept car developed by Polish automotive manufacturer AMZ-Kutno in collaboration with pharmaceutical company Polfarmex SA. It is styled after, and designed as a spiritual successor to the FSO Syrena.

== Development ==
Work on the project began in 2012, with the first working prototype being presented in January 2014. The main designer of the project was Andrzej Stasiak. Presentation and homologation was scheduled for 2014, alongside the official premiere at the Poznań International Fair. As of mid 2015, five prototypes existed, and the homologation process was planned to be completed by the end of the year. Initially, it was planned that the car would be produced only from parts manufactured in Poland, but due to a lack of companies producing such parts, approximately 40% were to be obtained from other countries. In autumn 2015, road tests for the car took place on the A1 motorway. Production of the Syrenka was expected to commence in the first quarter of 2016, with mass production scheduled for the second half of the year, with an initial output of 300-500 units annually. In addition to the more developed three-door version, work was also carried out on proposed sports, delivery and five-door models. AMZ-Kutno also stated that it would launch subsequent hatchback and delivery versions of the Syrenka.

The project (worth PLN 7.5 million) was co-financed with PLN 4.5 million by the National Center for Research and Development, under their Demonstrator program.

During the preparation stage of the project, talks were held with rival manufacturer AK Motor International Corporation regarding potential collaboration.

Following the Syrenka project, the collaboration between AMZ-Kutno and Polfarmex ended. On the initiative of Polfarmex, a new company was established, named Fabryka Samochodów Osobowych "Syrena" w Kutnie. This new company subsequently developed a new prototype, a five-door hatchback named the Vosco S106, using components from the Opel Adam.
