= Vosco S106 =

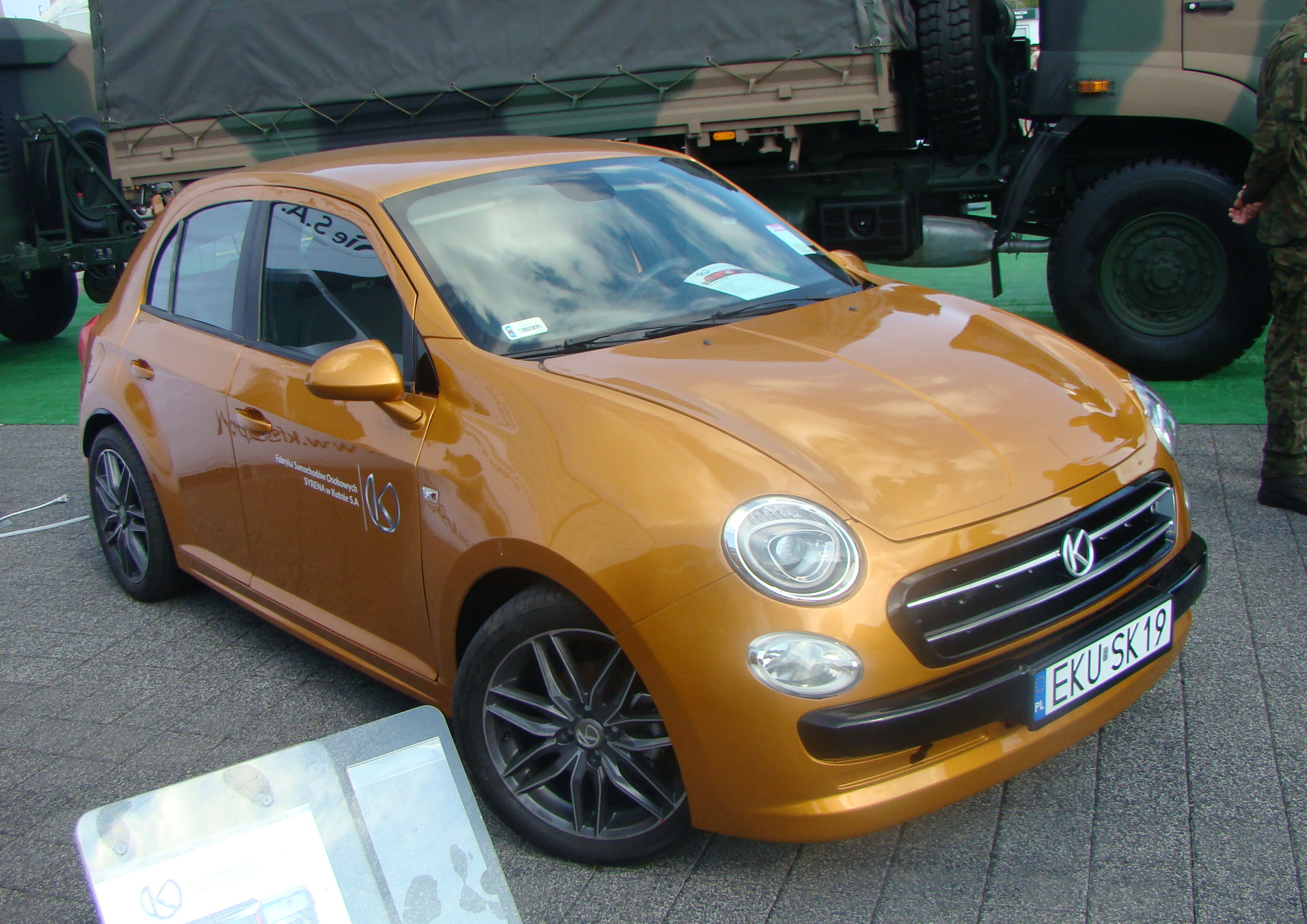
- Prototype presented at MSPO 2019

Overview
- Manufacturer: FSO Syrena
- Production: 2017
- Model years: 2017-2018 (8 prototypes)

Body and chassis
- Class: Supermini(B)
- Body style: 5-door hatchback
- Layout: Front wheel drive
- Related: AMZ Syrenka, AK Syrena Meluzyna

Powertrain
- Engine: Petrol R4 1.4 90 HP
- Transmission: 5-speed manual

Dimensions
- Curb weight: 1245 kg

The Vosco S106 was a Polish concept car developed by FSO Syrena in Kutno. It is styled after, and designed as a spiritual successor to the FSO Syrena.

== History ==
In 2012, work on the AMZ Syrenka project began, with the first prototype being completed in 2014. By 2015, there were five prototypes. The project was cancelled in 2016 due to the end of the partnership between manufacturers AMZ-Kutno and Polfarmex SA.

By the end of 2016, a new arrangement was formed between Polfarmex and the FSO "Syrena" Factory. Development began on a new project, the Vosco S106, with the first car being completed in 2017.

In April 2018, the S106 was undergoing homologation tests and was reported to be almost ready for production, with 8 prototypes created. Initial production would be limited to 100-300 cars annually, with production of 1000-2000 cars annually planned for the future.
