= AK Syrena Meluzyna =

Overview
- Type: Concept Car
- Manufacturer: AK Motor, FSO

Body and chassis
- Class: Supermini(B)
- Related: AMZ Syrenka, Vosco S106

Powertrain
- Engine: Petrol

Dimensions
- Wheelbase: 2508mm
- Length: 4062mm
- Width: 1800mm
- Height: 1479mm

The AK Syrena Meluzyna is a concept car developed by Canadian company AK Motor International Corporation, as a modern interpretation of the FSO Syrena.

This car was intended to be produced and developed in the FSO SA plants on the basis of an agreement between FSO and AK Motor, ratified in January 2015. Two versions were planned, the AK Syrena Meluzyna and the AK Syrena Ligea. The logo of the Syrena Ligea was designed by Paweł Panczakiewicz, a relative of Stanisław Panczakiewicz, who was the designer of the original Syrena. The Meluzyna was to be a retro-style city car available in several variants, starting with the basic Meluzyna L model equipped with a 3- or 4-cylinder engine, and with a capacity of up to 1.5 liters, built by Dytko Sport (a company specialized in designing and building prototype cars for rally and racing). The next model was to have a 2-litre engine. The next version would have had a more powerful 2.5-3 liter engine with all-wheel drive. The exclusive "S" Turbo version was to have a 3-litre turbocharged engine, with production planned at the former Zakład Samochodów Dostawczych plant in Nysa. Besides this, a hybrid model was also planned.
