= Infantry mobility vehicle =

Wheeled armored personnel carrier

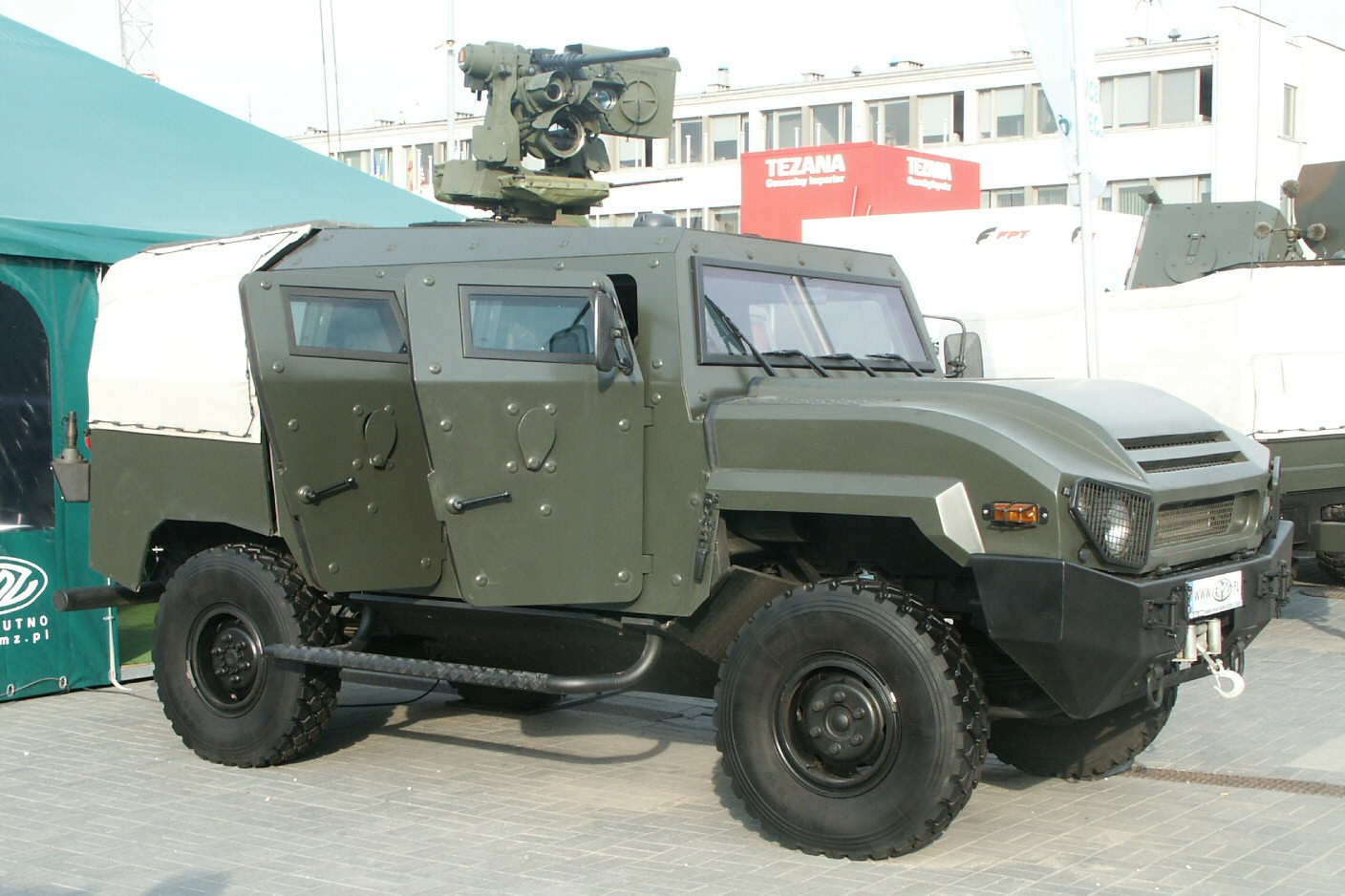
Polish AMZ Tur infantry mobility vehicle

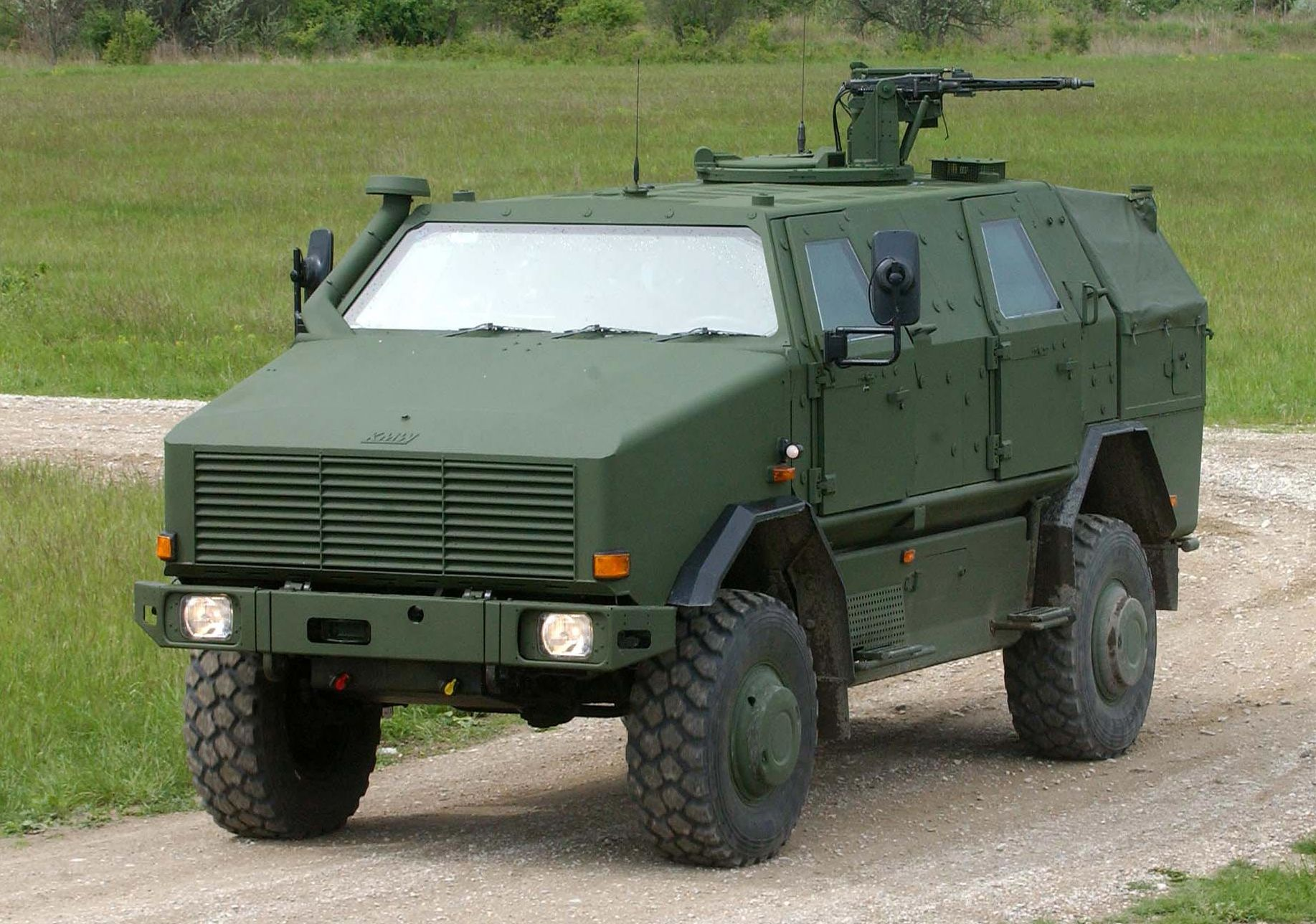
The ATF Dingo of the German Army is a well-protected infantry mobility vehicle used by several European armed forces

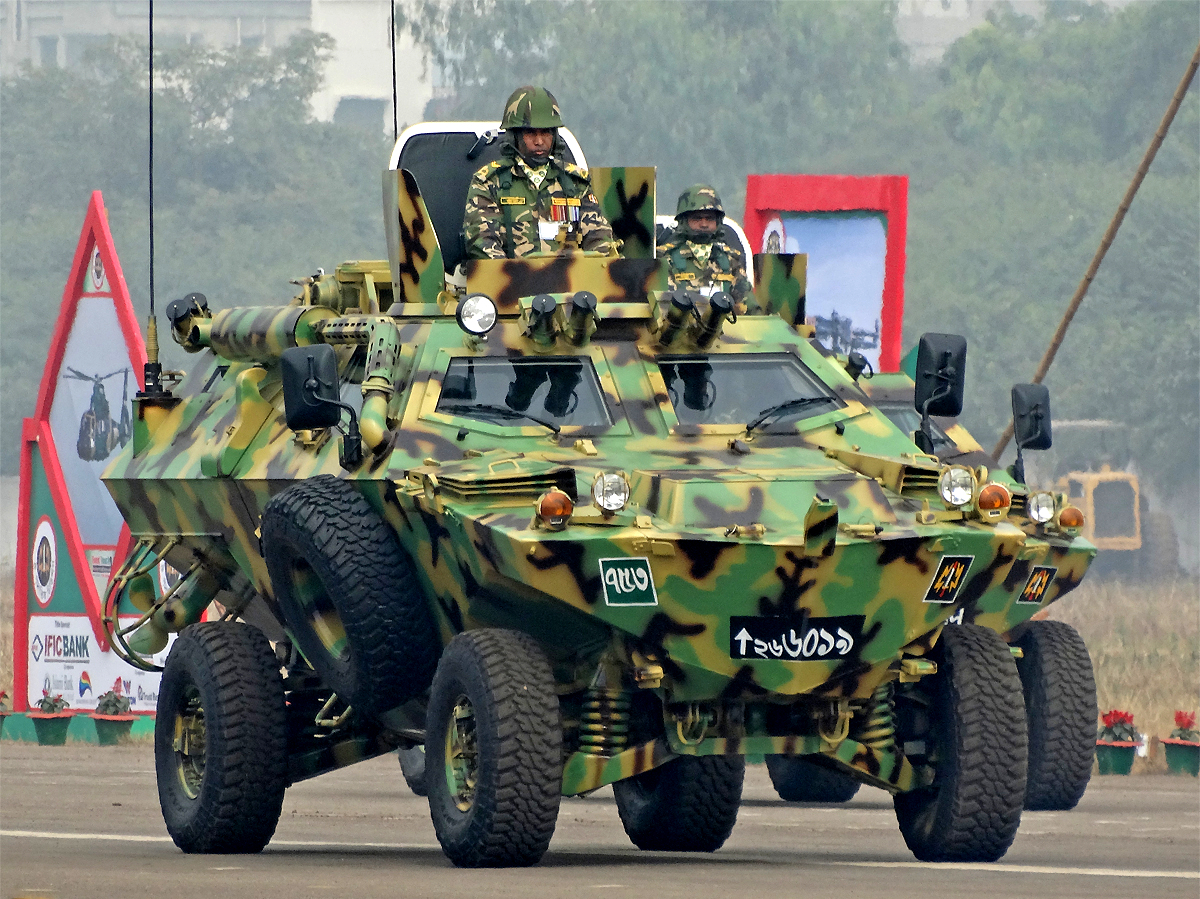
Turkish made V-hull design Otokar Cobra of the Bangladesh Army

An infantry mobility vehicle (IMV) is a four-wheel drive armored personnel carrier (APC) serving as an armed military transport, military patrol, reconnaissance or security vehicle. Those IMVs are distinct from 8-, 6-, and 4-wheeled APCs (such as the VAB), being closer in appearance to civilian vehicles. The physical appearance of the Infantry mobility vehicles are generally similar to the SUV, covered Pickup truck or Box truck. Examples include the ATF Dingo, Otokar Cobra II, Iveco LMV, AMZ Dzik, AMZ Tur, Mungo ESK, and Bushmaster. Most modern infantry mobility vehicles have certain level of Mine-Resistant Ambush Protected (MRAP) capabilities.

IMVs were developed in response to the threats of modern warfare, with an emphasis on crew protection and mine-resistance. Similar vehicles existed long before the term IMV was coined, such as the French VAB and South African Buffel. The term is coming more into use to differentiate light 4x4 wheeled APCs from the traditional 6x6 and 8x8 wheeled APCs. The up-armored M1114 Humvee variant can be seen as an adaptation of the unarmoured Humvee to serve in the IMV role.

== Etymology ==
In 1994, the Australian Department of Defence identified the need to mobilise infantry through the acquisition of unprotected and protected vehicles. This eventually led to the development of the Bushmaster Infantry Mobility Vehicle, later referred to as the Bushmaster Protected Mobility Vehicle.

== History ==
Infantry Mobility Vehicles were first found during the Rhodesian Bush War. In response to the growing threat of mines, a number of "Mine Ambush Protected" vehicles were produced in an improvised manner for Rhodesian government forces in unit workshops and national steel working firms from about 1972. Similar units were developed by South Africa, such as the Casspir.

The Bushmaster Infantry Mobility Vehicle was designed for the Australian military in the 1990s and hundreds of vehicles entered service.

In response to the increased threat of IEDs in the Global War on Terror, a large number of IMVs were acquired by belligerents. In 2002, the United States Marine Corps began deploying Cougars built by Force Protection for use in Afghanistan. Thousands of units have been ordered as part of the American Mine Resistant Ambush Protected and Joint Light Tactical Vehicle programs, respectively. IMVs were deployed extensively by ISAF forces in Afghanistan. They have were deployed by the US, UK, and Australia during the Iraq War.

In 2018, Peshmerga forces in Syria were seen in American built IMVs.

== Purpose ==
Infantry Mobility Vehicles are designed to supplant lighter, less protected vehicles among rear echelon troops and in low intensity conflict. They are a more protected alternative to jeeps and medium trucks in patrol and transportation roles. They are designed to counter mines and ambushes; these include sporadic small arms fire, threats such as IEDs and anti-tank mines, and man portable anti tank weapons such as the RPG-7.

== Design ==
Infantry Mobility Vehicles share similar design to the trucks they are designed to replace. The front and side windshields will be made of ballistic glass. They generally feature a v-hull shaped underbelly with additional crew protection features such as four- point seat belts and seats suspended from the roof or sides of the vehicle. IMVs are resistant to small arms and explosives but aren't designed to defeat heavy machine gun and cannon fire, or shaped charge attack.

Infantry Mobility Vehicles carry weapons typical of armoured personnel carriers. Many feature a machine gun on the roof, either on a ring mount or a remote weapon system.

IMVs are typically designed to have much greater protection from IEDs than other armoured vehicles, with crews able to survive blasts that would be lethal in more conventional armoured personnel carriers. They are typically much heavier than unarmoured vehicles, with weight typically greater than six tonnes, and ranging to as much as thirty.

Being designed for patrol and transportation rather than direct combat, they are designed to have good on road mobility. They are often capable of road speeds approaching or exceeding 100km/h, high for an armoured vehicle. Offroad maneuverability may be limited due to lack of all wheel drive, power to weight, and high ground pressure.

Many are derived from existing truck chassis. The original Rhodesian Mine Ambush Protected vehicles were derived from Unimog, Mercedes, and Nissan truck chassis.

== Models ==
The term refers to a wide range of vehicles developed by a number of nations:

- ATF Dingo
- AMZ Dzik
- AMZ Tur
- AMZ Żubr
- Bushmaster IMV/PMV
- BAE Caiman – Part of the American MRAP program
- COMBATGUARD
- Cougar – Part of the American MRAP program
- Didgori series
- Dongfeng Mengshi
- First Win
- Force Protection Ocelot
- GAZ Tigr
- GAZ Vodnik
- Golan Armoured Vehicle
- Grizzly APC
- Hawkei PMV-L
- Hunter TR-12
- Iveco LMV – Several thousand ordered by Italian military and other European militaries
- Kalyani M4
- Kamaz Typhoon – Part of the Russian Typhoon program
- Kozak (armored personnel carrier)
- M16 Miloš
- Mahindra Armored Light Specialist Vehicle
- Mahindra Marksman
- Mine Protected Combat Vehicle – Rhodesia IMV from 1979.
- Mohafiz
- Mungo ESK
- Nexter Aravis
- Nimr
- Novator – Ukrainian infantry mobility vehicle
- Oshkosh M-ATV – Part of the American MRAP program
- Oshkosh L-ATV – Selected to meet US military's JLTV requirement on 25 August 2015
- Otokar Cobra
- Otokar Cobra II
- RG-33
- RMMV Survivor R Joint venture between RMMV of Germany and Achleitner of Austria
- Roshel Senator
- STREIT Group Spartan
- TAD Turangga
- Toofan – Iranian MRAP infantry mobility vehicle
- URO VAMTAC
- Varta
- ZFB-05

== Gallery ==
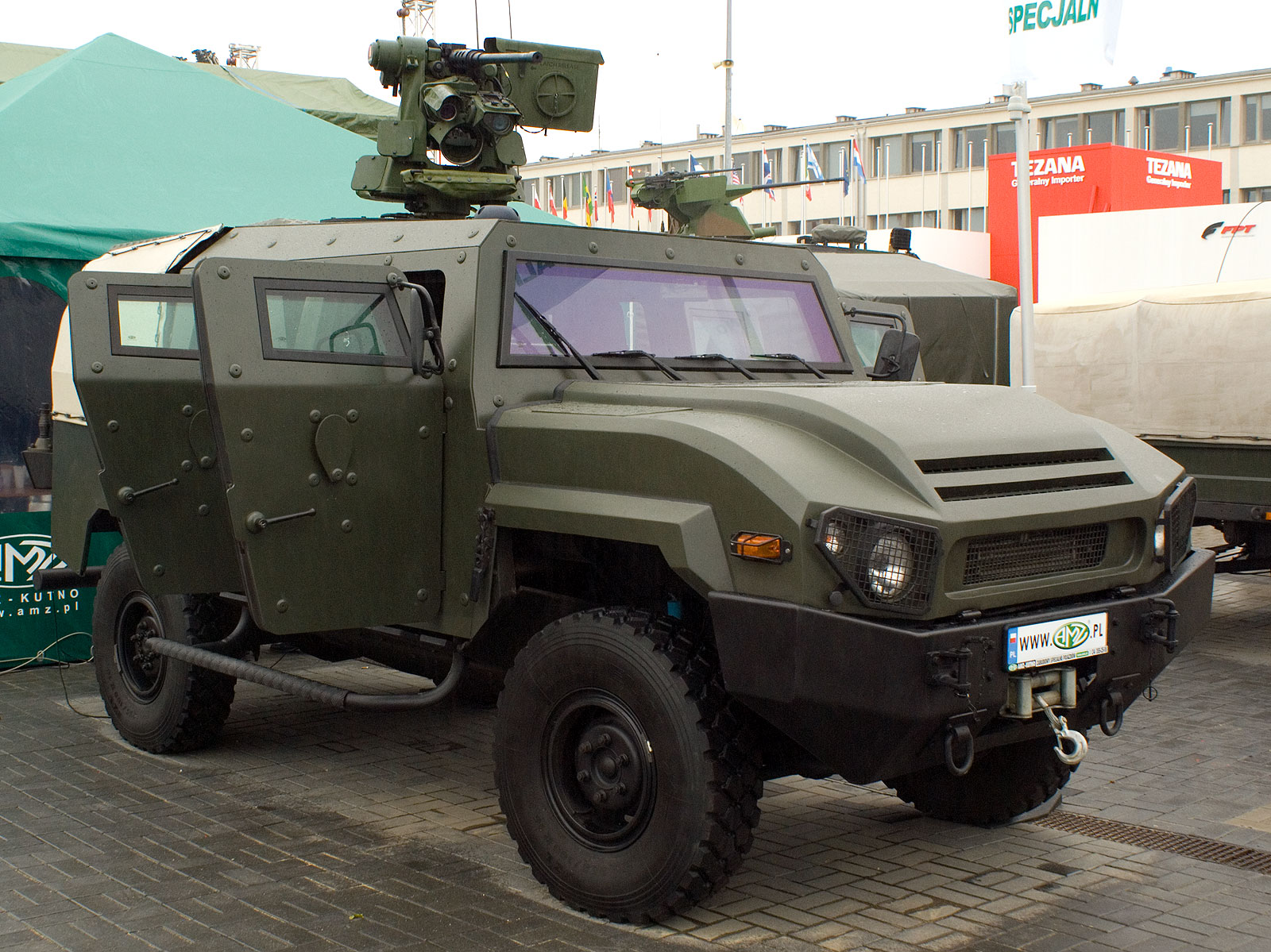
Polish AMZ Tur

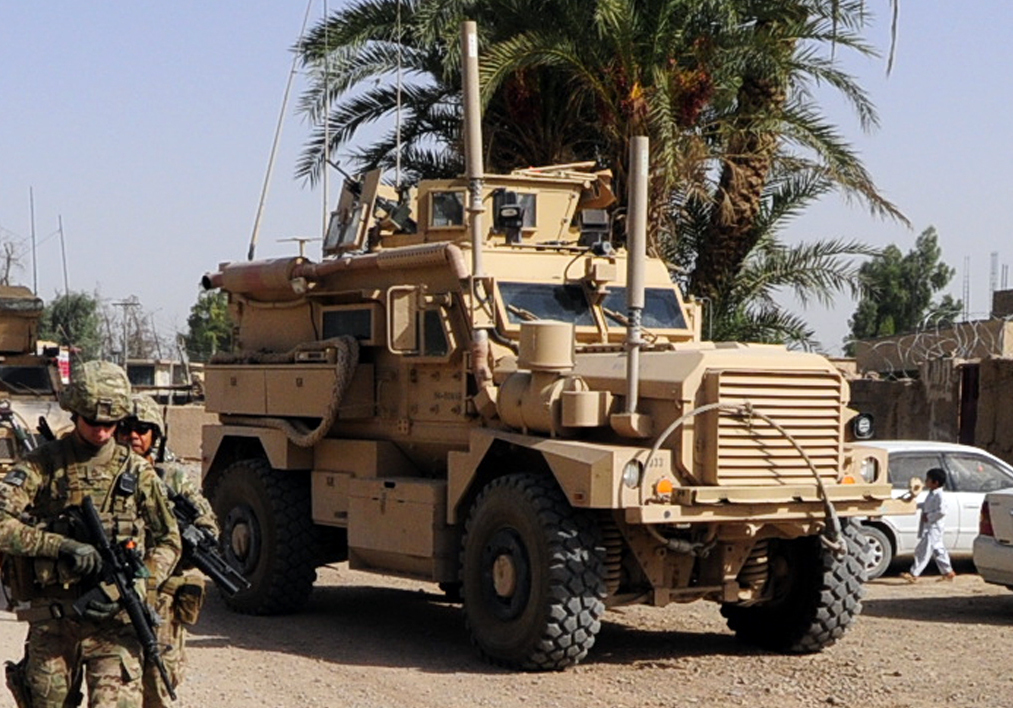
Cougar H

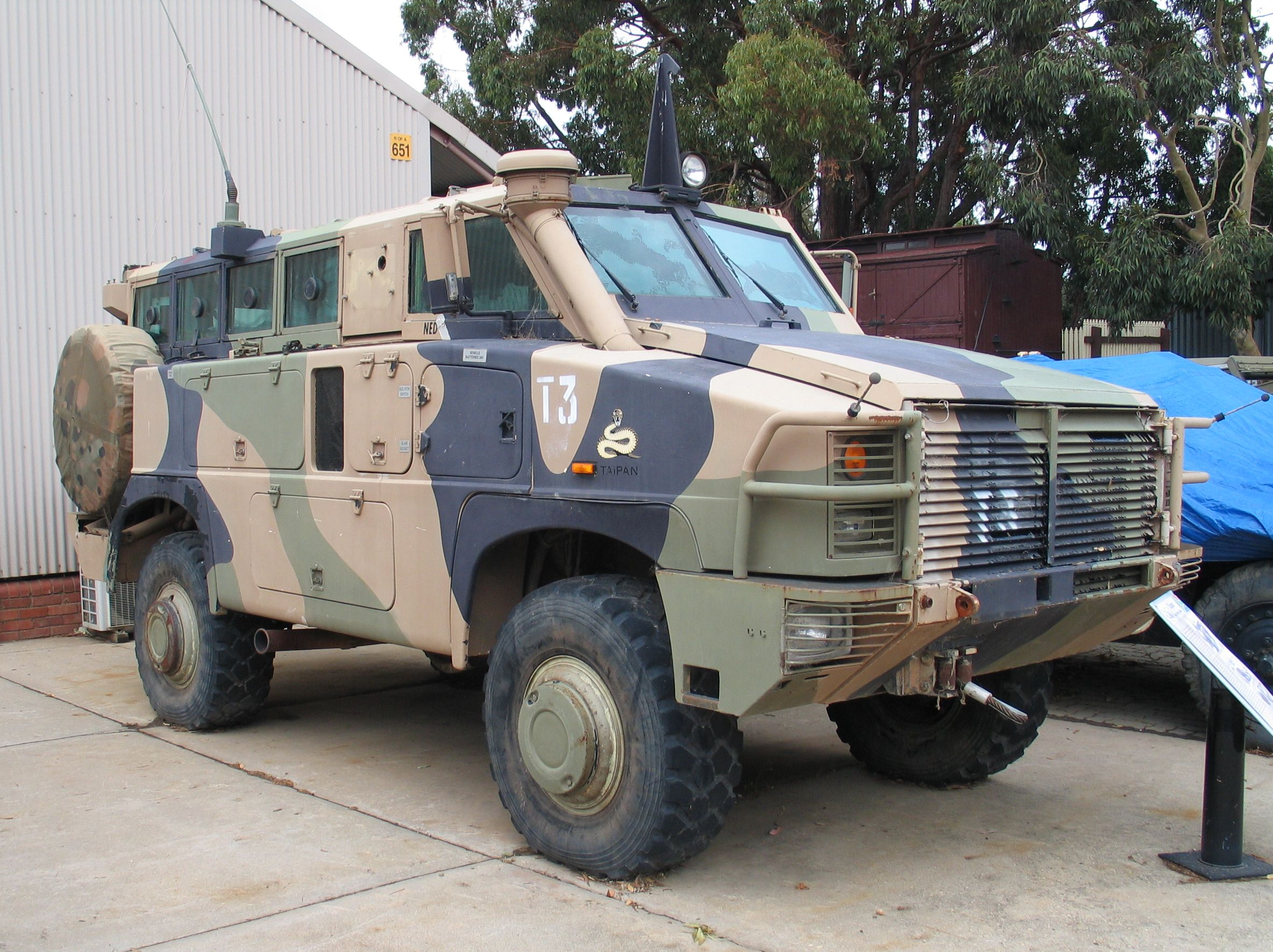
Taipan by Australian Specialised Vehicle Systems, based on the Mamba APC

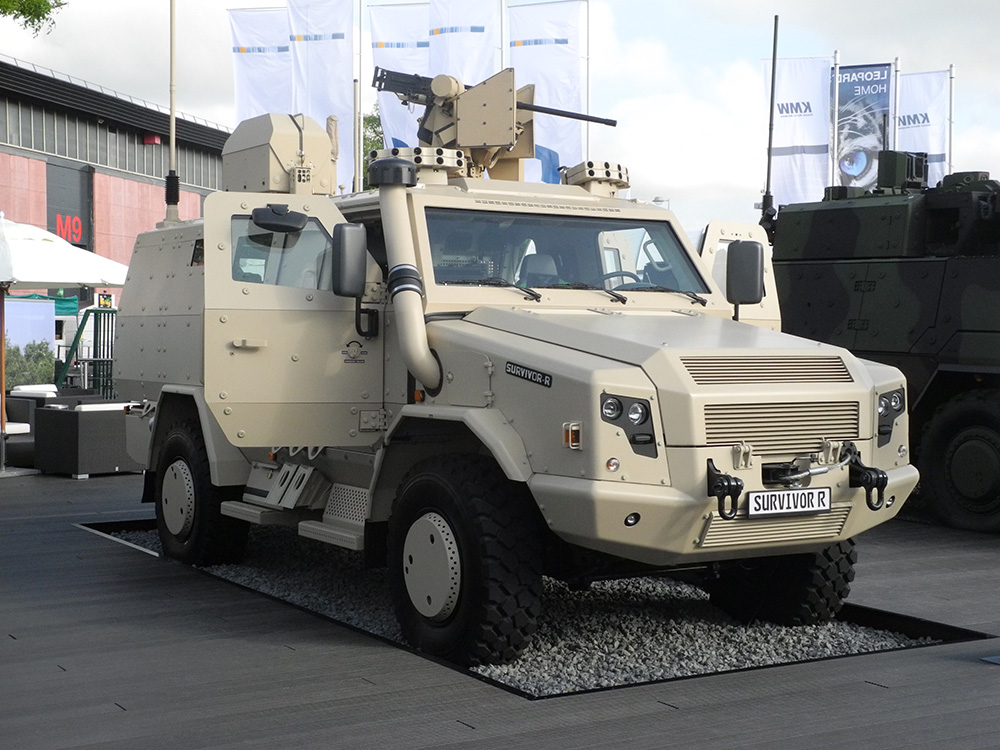
RMMV Survivor R

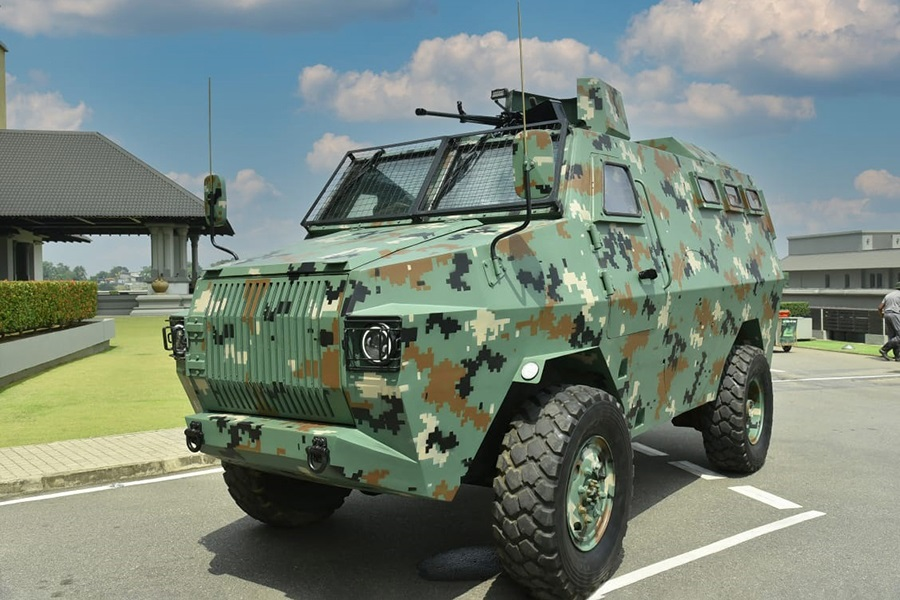
Unicob
