= TAD Turangga =

Indonesian infantry mobility vehicle

Tugasanda Turangga
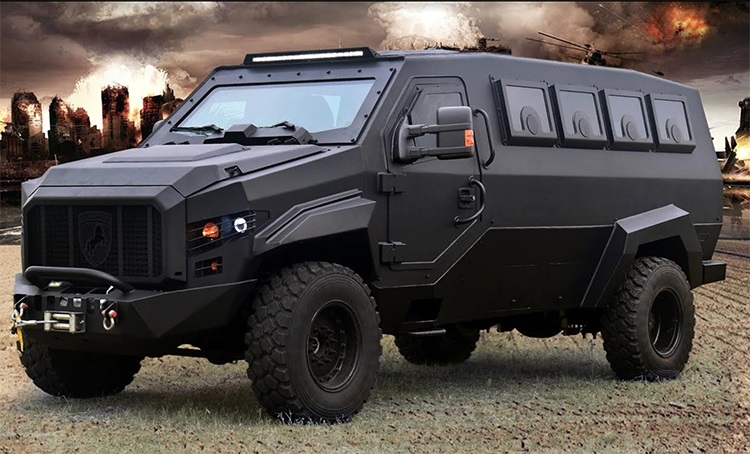
- APC Version
- Type: APC; Infantry mobility vehicle
- Place of origin: Indonesia

Production history
- Manufacturer: TAD
- Produced: 2016 – present

Specifications
- Mass: 7,845 kilograms (17,295 lb) (empty); 8,845 kilograms (19,500 lb) (full)
- Length: 6,470 mm (254.7 in)
- Width: 2,400 mm (94.5 in)
- Height: 2,480 mm (97.6 in)
- Crew: 2 + 10 troops
- Armor: CEN Level B6 (withstand 7.62x51 mm FJ/PB/SC), V hull underbelly
- Main armament: 7.62 to 12.7 mm machinegun, 40 mm AGL, operated manually or using RCWS
- Engine: 6,700 cc Ford V8 turbocharged diesel 400 horsepower (300 kW)
- Power/weight: 44 hp/ton
- Transmission: Automatic 6 speed
- Ground clearance: 650 mm
- Fuel capacity: 160 litres
- Operational range: 800 km
- Maximum speed: 110 kilometres per hour (68 mph)

The TAD Turangga is an Indonesian armored infantry mobility vehicle developed by Tugasanda Defense (TAD). The name means horse in Javanese.

== Design ==
The Turangga is built on the chassis of the Ford 550 Heavy Duty, which is popular to be converted into a military vehicle because of its reliability. Almost everything belongs to the Ford F550, be it the chassis, suspension, steering wheel, brakes, gearbox and transfer case.

The troop transport type (APC) can be loaded with 12 soldiers, including the commander and driver. In this role, Turangga is designed to carry out missions such as rapid raids, peacekeeping operations and convoy escorts. The Turangga can be driven at a maximum speed on flat roads of up to 110 km/h. The fuel tank capacity is 160 liters of diesel, which is enough fuel for the vehicle to travel up to 800 km.

In appearance, Turangga's design seems to be inspired by the Typhoon MRAP, made by the Streit Group, from the United Arab Emirates. However, Turangga does not have the ability to withstand land mines like the Typhoon. The level of protection for the steel welded body, is STANAG Level 2. The vehicle is equipped with explosion protection in the form of V hull construction. To protect against the effects of explosions, the Turangga is designed with a ground clearance of 650 mm.

The four wheels adopt the run flat type 20-750 ATR Rubber with the Michelin 333/80R20 brand, meaning that the wheels are also capable of withstanding the brunt of bullets. In addition to providing shooting holes for assault rifles from inside the cabin, there are four points on the side glass and one on the rear window.

The Turannga's roof can also be armed with 7.62 or 12.7 mm machine guns or 40 mm automatic grenade launcher, which is operated manually. It is also possible to equip a remote control weapon station (RCWS).

Recognizing the importance of protecting the fuel tank, this component is covered in a ballistic steel case. The fuel carries the Euro 3 emission standard. To extend the range, 2×20 liter jerry cans with extra fuel can be added. The Turangga 4×4 belonging to Paskhas TNI AU comes complete with U/VHF and HF communication radio, winch, NATO light gun ports in every troop window, and rifle rack.

== Variants ==
- Wheeled APC
- Search and rescue: The SAR version of Turangga uses Mitsubishi New Triton GLS MT Double Cab 4WD as the base. It costed more than Rp900 million. It is 2.5 meters high and has a capacity of 9 people.
- Reconnaissance

== Users ==
- Indonesia: Used by Paskhas.

== Gallery ==
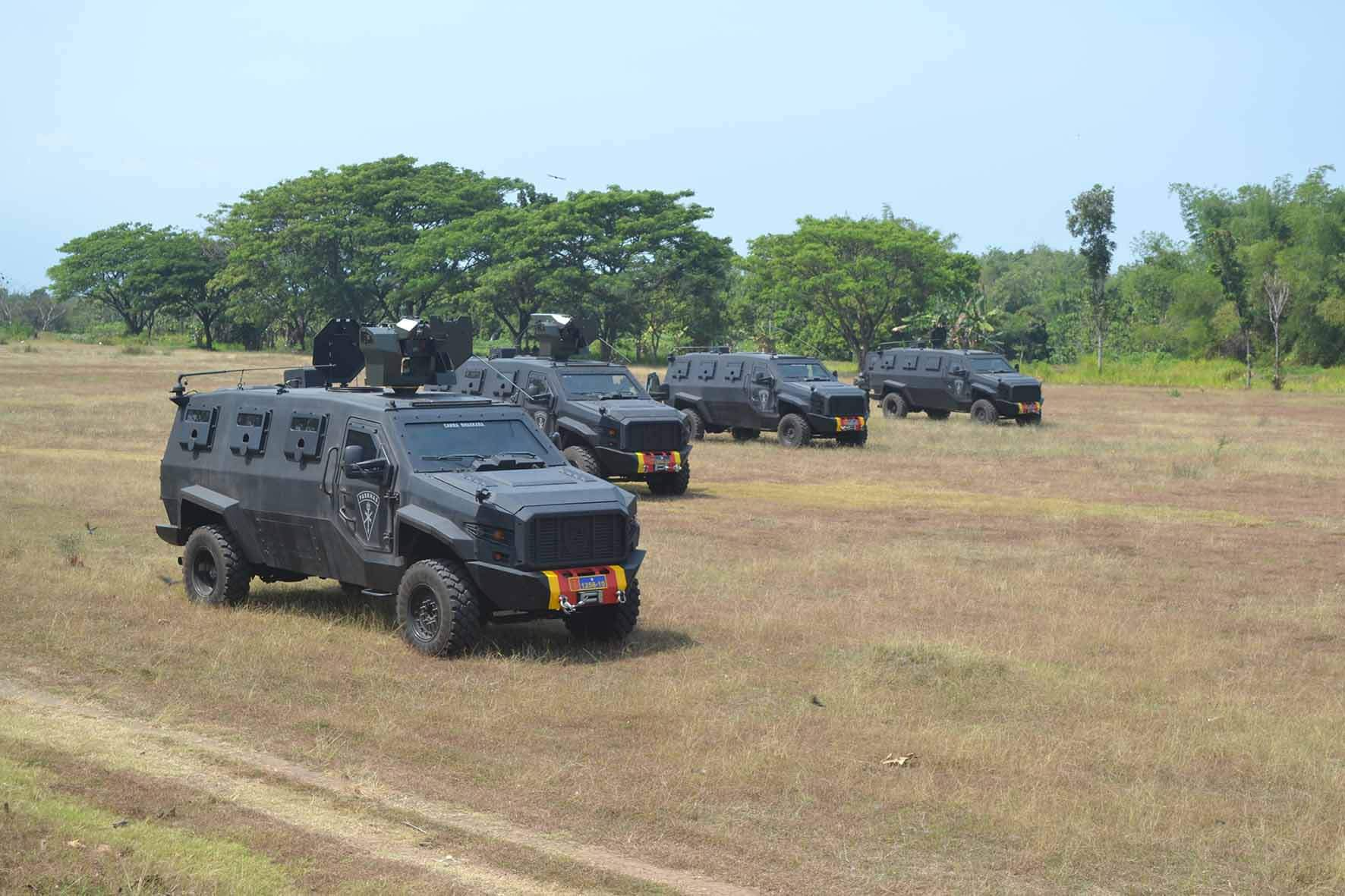
Turangga equipped with Aselsan SARP RCWS

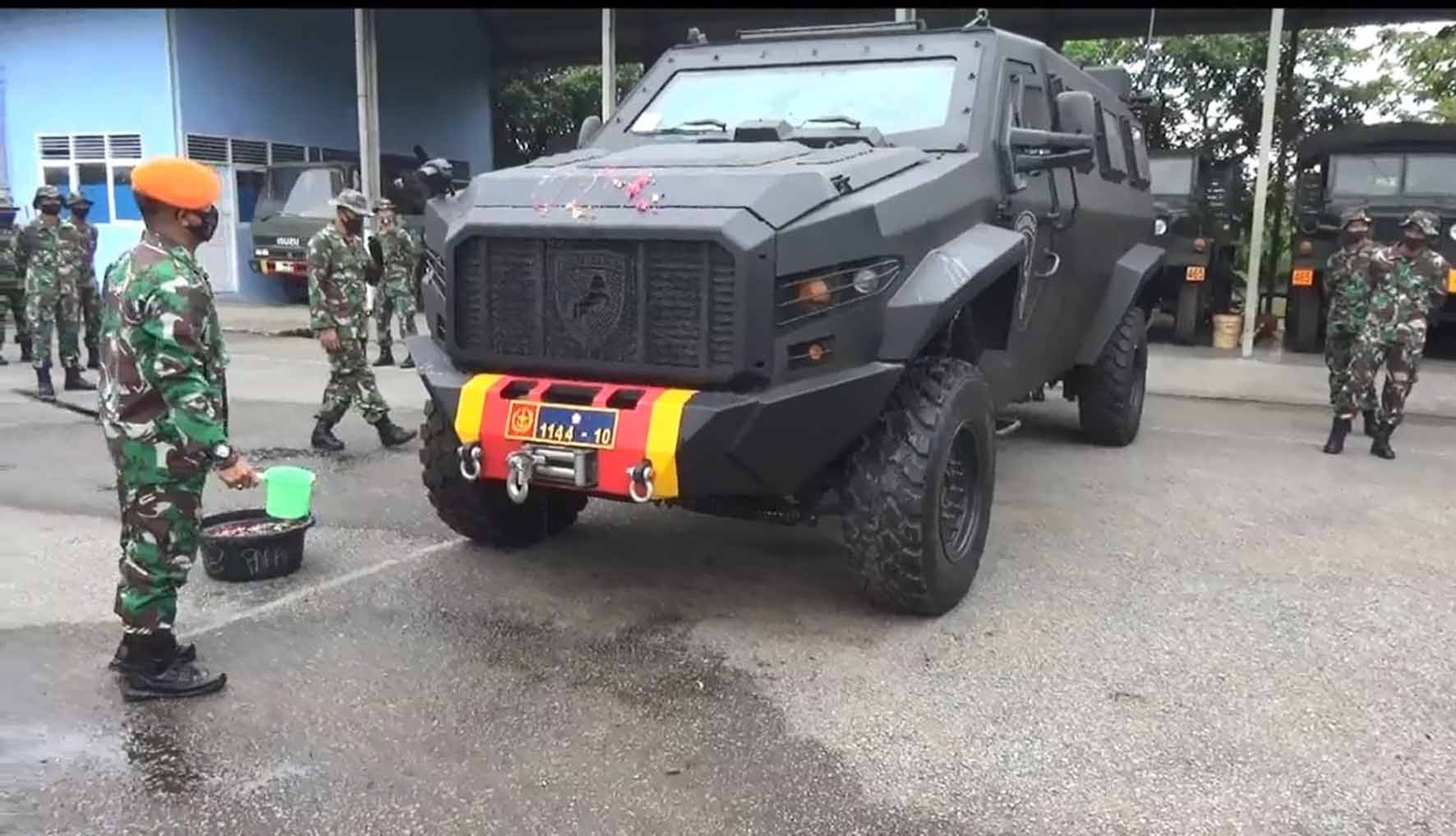
Turangga of Paskhas
