= AMZ Tur =

Tur
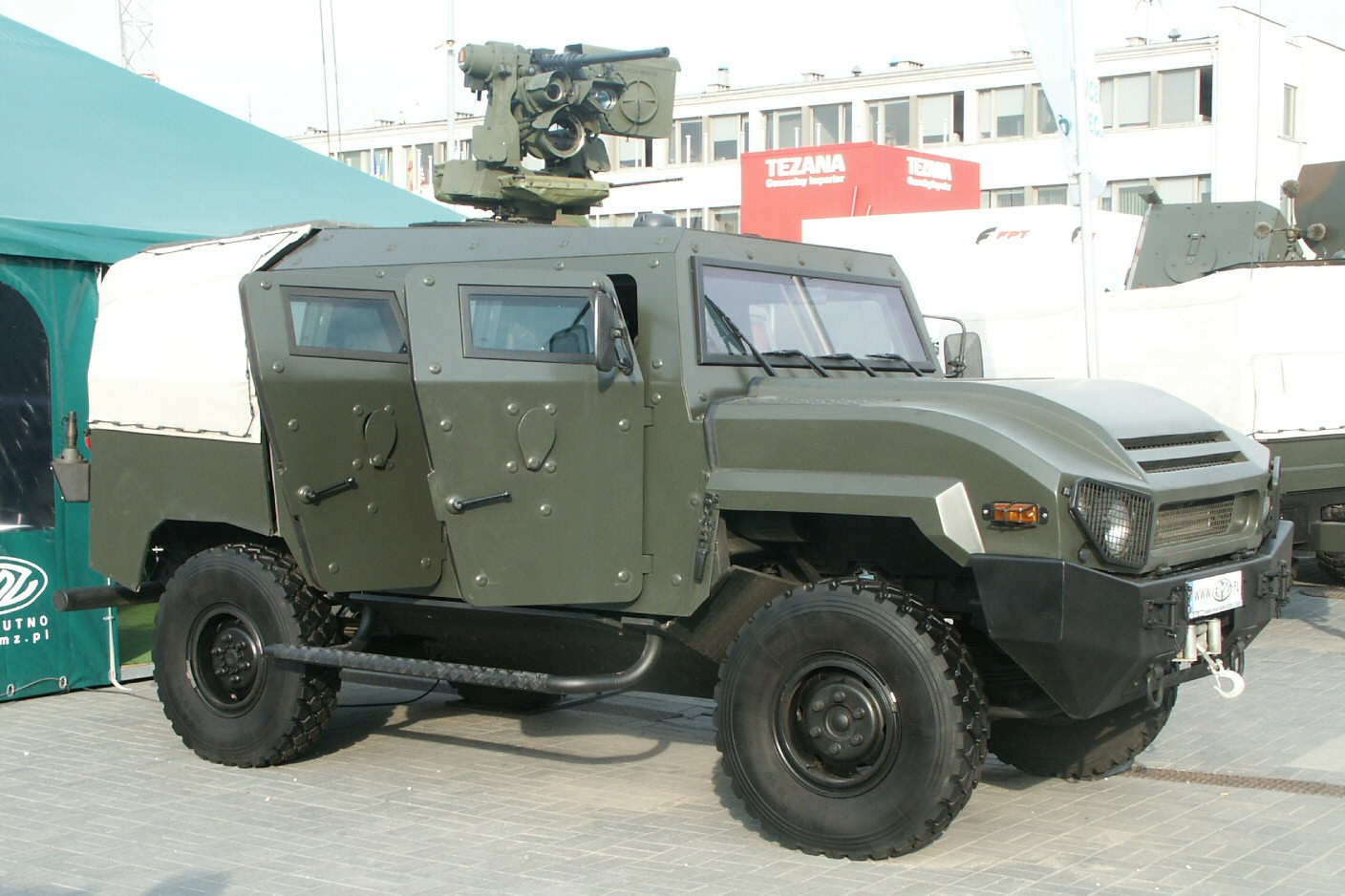
- Early Tur prototype
- Type: Infantry mobility vehicle
- Place of origin: Poland

Specifications
- Mass: 4.8 tonnes
- Length: 4.87 metres (191.7 in)
- Width: 2.23 metres (87.8 in)
- Height: 2.35 metres (92.5 in)
- Crew: 1+4
- Armor: level 2,2a,3 STANAG 4569
- Engine: Iveco Aifo; 122 kW (166 PS)
- Suspension: leaf spring, rigid axle
- Operational range: 600 kilometres (370 mi)

Tur (Tur 1) (Polish: Aurochs) is a light infantry mobility vehicle designed by the Polish factory AMZ-Kutno in 2007. The Tur was designed for intervention and patrol tasks behind front lines, specially equipped for operations in dangerous areas. It has a five person transport capacity.

== Design ==
The vehicle was developed especially for the Polish military contingents in Iraq and Afghanistan in response to requests of the soldiers stationed there. Its design and armour allows it to withstand an explosion equal to 6 kg (13 lb) of TNT. It may be fitted with a remote turret. The mechanical part of the vehicle (engine, transmission, suspension) comes mostly from Iveco.

It is designed as a safer and more modern alternative to the Humvee operated by the Polish Land Forces. Despite needs of military contingents, as for 2009 no orders were made, and a contest for a light armoured patrol car (LOSP in Polish) was not settled (its main counterpart is Iveco LMV). As of 2008, five prototypes were made, two of them were destroyed in tests. The last, fifth one has modified look of a forward part, and minor improvements. In 2008, AMZ-Kutno developed a new, bigger variant Tur II. Two prototype Tur 3 vehicles completed mobility trials with the National Security Guard. A single Tu IV prototype was developed for the Indonesian National Guard. The Tur V and Tur VI were unveiled at the International Defense Exhibition in Poland (MSPO). In 2018 the AMZ Tur VI went into production. The Tur VII was introduced in 2022, along with a medical evacuation variant.

== Engine ==
- Type: Iveco Aifo 4-cylinders, turbocharger and intercooler, Common Rail
- Capacity: 2,998 cc (182.9 cu in)
- Power: 122 kW (166 PS)

== Technical specification ==
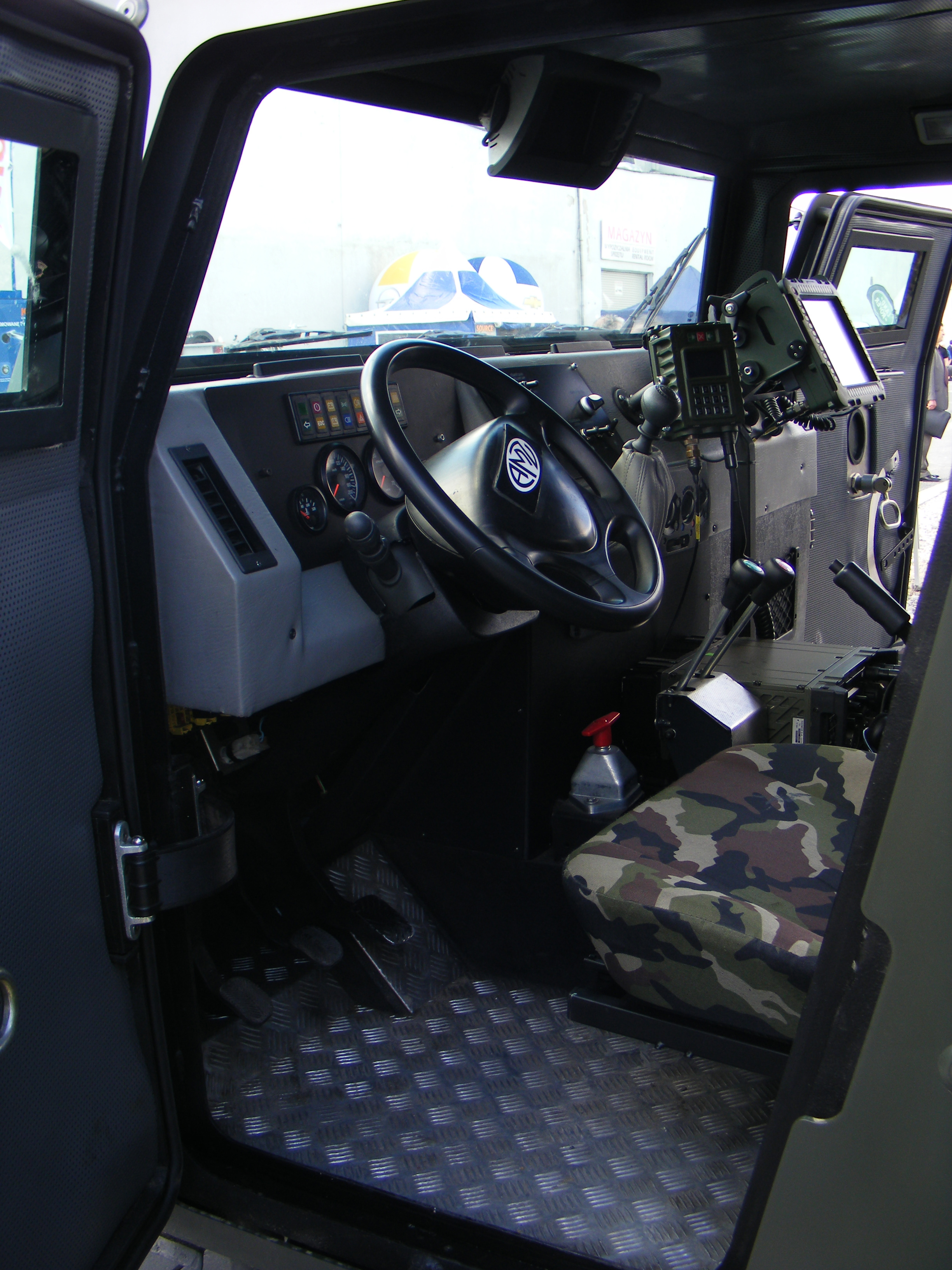
Driver's compartment

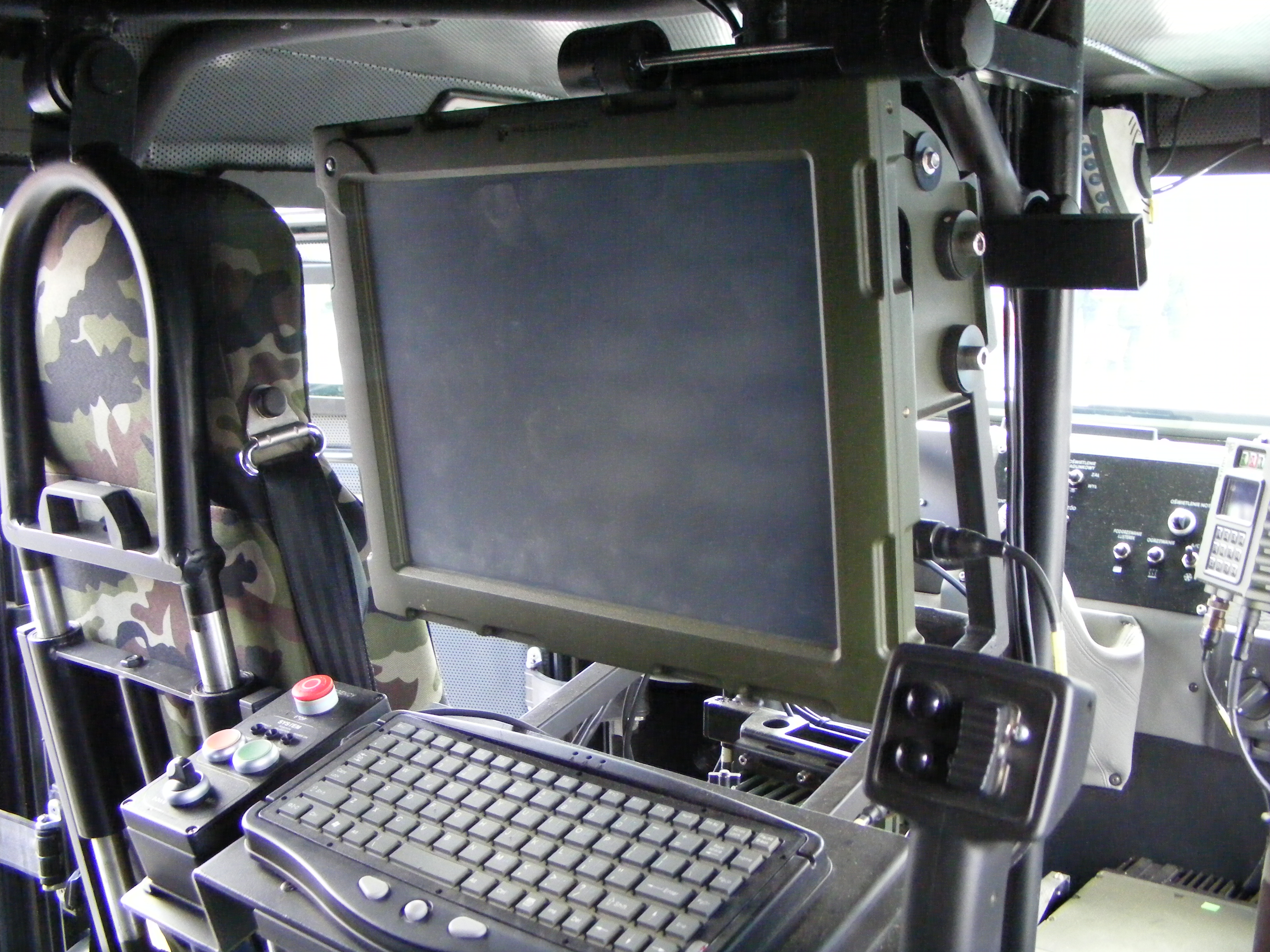
Gunner's control panel

- Gearbox: manual with 6 forward and 1 reverse gears
- Permanent 4 wheel drive mechanism
- Clutch: Hydraulic, dry, single disk
- Reduction gear and transfer case allow to use 24 gear ratios: 12 for road drive and 12 for off-road
- Fuel tank: 220 litres (58.1 US gal; 48.4 imp gal)
- Range: 600 km (370 mi)

== Vehicle ballistic armouring ==
- Protecting crew against armor-piercing Incendiary bullet: 7.62×39mm API BZ (Level 2 - STANAG 4569)
- Protecting crew against armor-piercing bullet: 7.62×54mmR B32 AP (Level 2 - STANAG 4569)
- Protecting crew against explosive material equal 6 kg (13 lb) of TNT (Level 2b - STANAG 4569)
- Engine protected by armoured steel plate FB6 class

== Vehicle dimensions and weight ==
- Gross vehicle weight rating (GVWR): 6,200 kg (13,669 lb)
- Payload: 1,000 kg (2,205 lb)
- Wheel base: 2,800 mm (9 ft 2 in)
- Track width: 1,700 mm (5 ft 7 in)
- Total length: 4,870 mm (16 ft 0 in)
- Height: 2,350 mm (7 ft 9 in) (to the roof level)
- Total width: 2,230 mm (7 ft 4 in).
- Fording depth (without preparation): 700 mm (2 ft 4 in)
- Crew: 5

== See also ==
- Dzik - armoured car
