= FSO Syrena in Kutno =

Fabryka Samochodów Osobowych "Syrena" w Kutnie
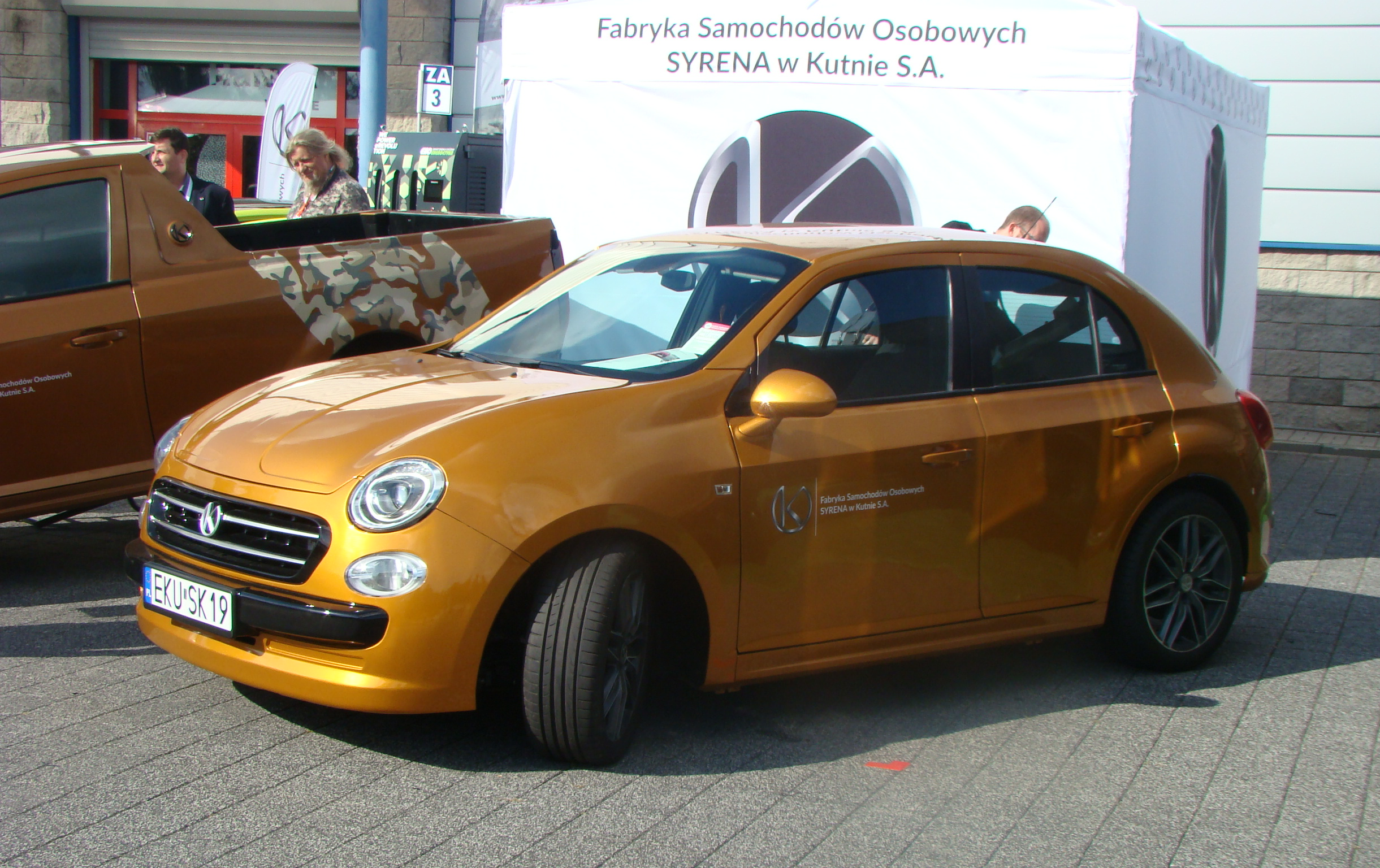
- Factory stand at MSPO 2019
- Company type: Joint-stock company
- Founded: 2014
- Headquarters: Kutno, Poland
- Key people: Janusz Woźniak (President)
- Website: kfso.pl

Fabryka Samochodów Osobowych "Syrena" w Kutnie (transl. Passenger Car Factory "Syrena" in Kutno) is a Polish car manufacturer that described itself as a successor of FSO and FSM. Plans included the development and manufacture of limited production, retro-style vehicles, referencing well known Polish cars such as the FSO Syrena, FSO Polonez, ZSD Nysa, Mikrus MR-300 and FSO Warszawa.

In 2017, the company received over PLN 4.6 million from the National Center for Research and Development under their INNOMOTO program. The company developed the Vosco S106 petrol-powered hatchback, obtaining approval for it in 2018 (the previous Polish car that received approval was the FSO Polonez). The next step for the company is to be the development of an electric vehicle based purely on research and development from within the company.

== Vehicles ==
- Vosco S106
- Vosco S106 EV

== Electric car ==
The Vosco S106EV model, which is currently undergoing road tests, and whose appearance refers to the Syrena that was once produced, is equipped with an engine with a nominal power of 115 kW (approx. 156 HP) with the option of a sport mode (175 kW, 240 HP). The engine will be powered by batteries with a capacity of 31.5 kWh, which, when driving in mixed mode, will allow the vehicle to travel over 200 km on a single charge (in the future, the range will be increased to up to 250 km). The vehicle is equipped with a Combo2 connector that enables charging with direct current, which, with a standard charger with a power of approximately 30 kW, will allow the battery to be replenished within an hour. The cars are also to be equipped with an on-board charger with a power of 3.3 kW, which will charge the car from a home socket in approximately 10–11 hours. The start of mass production was planned for 2021.
