= AMZ Dzik =

Dzik 3
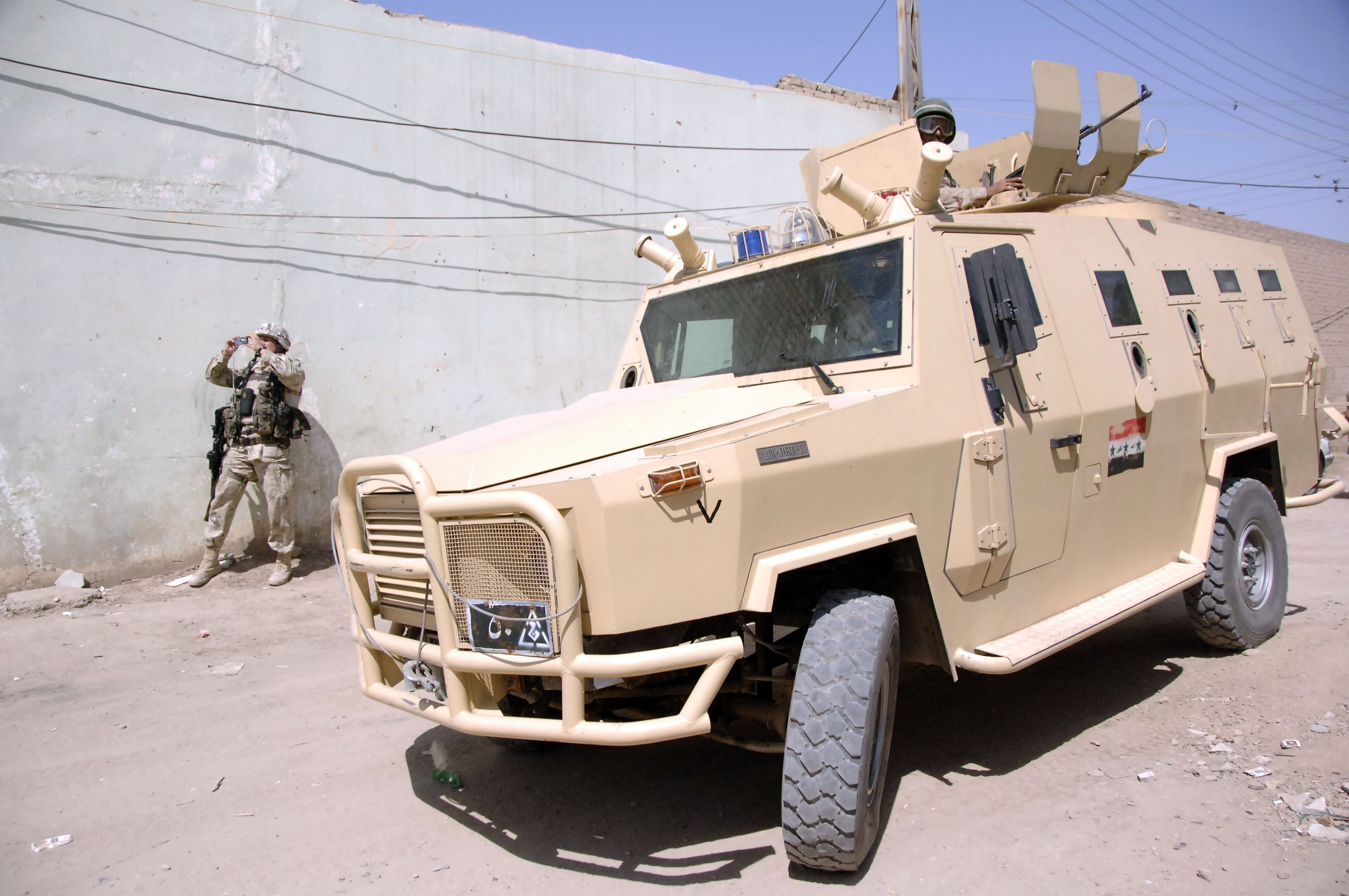
- Dzik-3 known as Ain Jaria-1
- Type: Infantry mobility vehicle
- Place of origin: Poland

Service history
- In service: 2004 - Present
- Used by: Iraq; Poland; Lithuania; Ukraine

Production history
- Produced: 2004

Specifications
- Mass: 4.5 tonnes (4.4 long tons; 5.0 short tons)
- Length: 5.74 metres (18.8 ft)
- Width: 2.05 metres (6 ft 9 in)
- Height: 2.16 metres (7 ft 1 in)
- Crew: 13
- Armor: Mostly B6 class armour; engine B4 armored
- Main armament: PK machine gun using 7.62×51mm NATO
- Secondary armament: As an alternative NSV using 12.7×108mm or 12.7×99mm NATO
- Engine: Iveco Aifo SOFIM 8140.43N; 107 kilowatts (143 hp)
- Power/weight: 32 horsepower per tonne (24 kW/t)
- Suspension: SM62
- Operational range: 800 kilometres (500 mi)
- Maximum speed: 100 kilometres per hour (62 mph)

Dzik (Polish: Wild Boar) is a 4.5-tonne (4.4-long-ton; 5.0-short-ton) Polish-made multi-purpose infantry mobility vehicle. Produced by the AMZ works in Kutno, it is designed for serving both the patrol and intervention roles, as well as an armoured personnel carrier for use by various peace-keeping and policing forces. Its armour provides defence against 7.62 mm bullets. The Dzik-3 also has bulletproof windows, puncture-proof tires and smoke launchers.

The Dzik cars are powered by a turbodiesel engine that produces 146 hp (107 kW) with a 2,797 cc (170.7 cu in) displacement.

== Variants ==
The Dzik is issued in four variants based on the same chassis:

- Dzik-AT (AT antyterrorystyczny - anti-terrorist) with 3 doors, room for up to 8 people and 10 firing ports.
- Dzik-2 with 5 doors, room for up to 8 people, 8 firing ports and a rotating machine gun turret in the roof.
- Dzik-3 (also known by the Iraqi designation Ain Jaria 1) with 4 doors, room for up to 11 soldiers, 13 firing ports, machine gun turret and two double smoke grenade launchers.
- Dzik Cargo with 2 doors, 2 firing ports, room for up to 3 people and a cargo hold.

Customers can also get Dziks in ambulance and anti-aircraft versions.

A number of Dzik-AT cars were bought by the Polish Ministerstwo Spraw Wewnętrznych i Administracji and are to replace obsolete BTR-60 APCs as the basic anti-terrorist vehicle in Polish service. Dzik-2 vehicles were used by the Polish Military Police (Żandarmeria Wojskowa), and were also known under a nickname Gucio (a diminutive of Gustav). They were withdrawn from service in 2014.

The Dzik-3 was specifically designed to fit the needs of the New Iraqi Army, where was adopted as the basic armoured personnel carrier. As of 2006, 600 Dzik-3 were ordered, with an option to extend the order to 1,000 or more.

== Operators ==
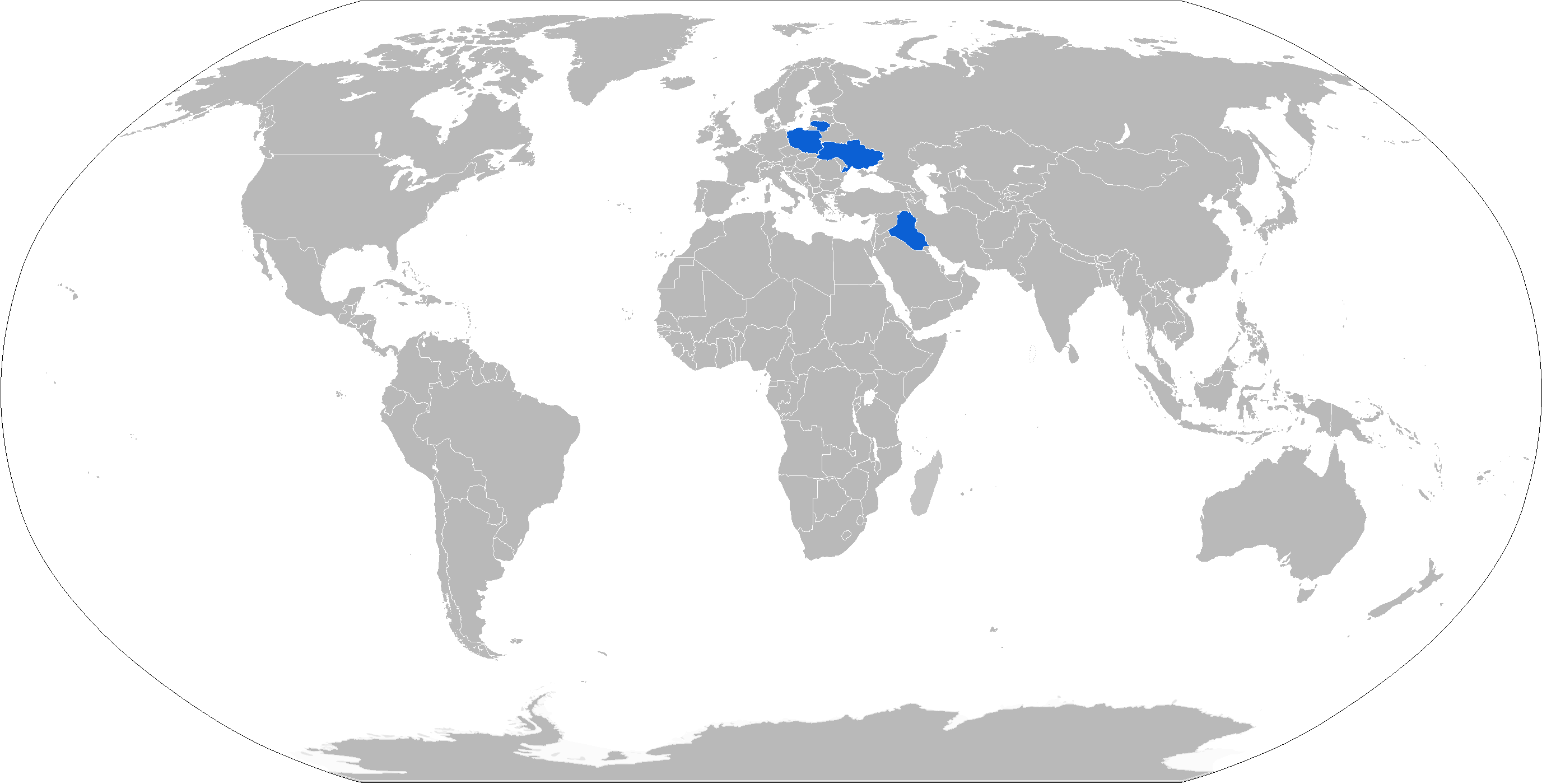
Map of AMZ Dzik operators in blue

=== Current operators ===
- Iraq
  - Iraqi Army - Dzik-3
- Lithuania
  - ARAS - Dzik-AT
- Poland
  - SPAP - Dzik-AT
- Ukraine
  - UAF - Dzik-2

== Gallery ==
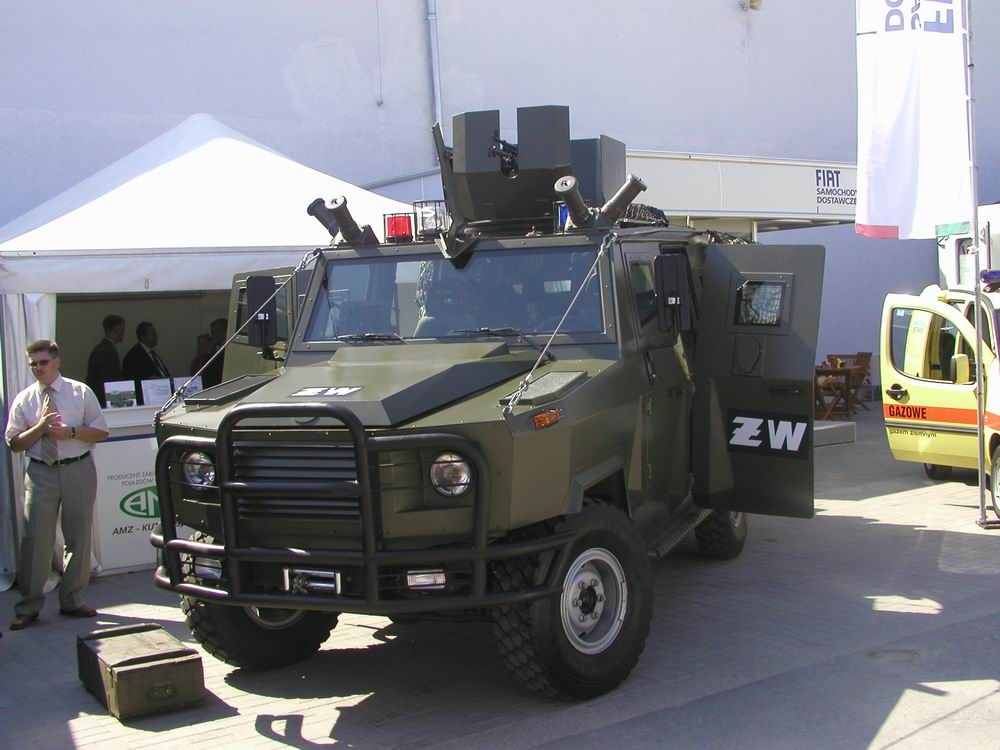
A Dzik-2 in the colours of the Polish Żandarmeria Wojskowa.

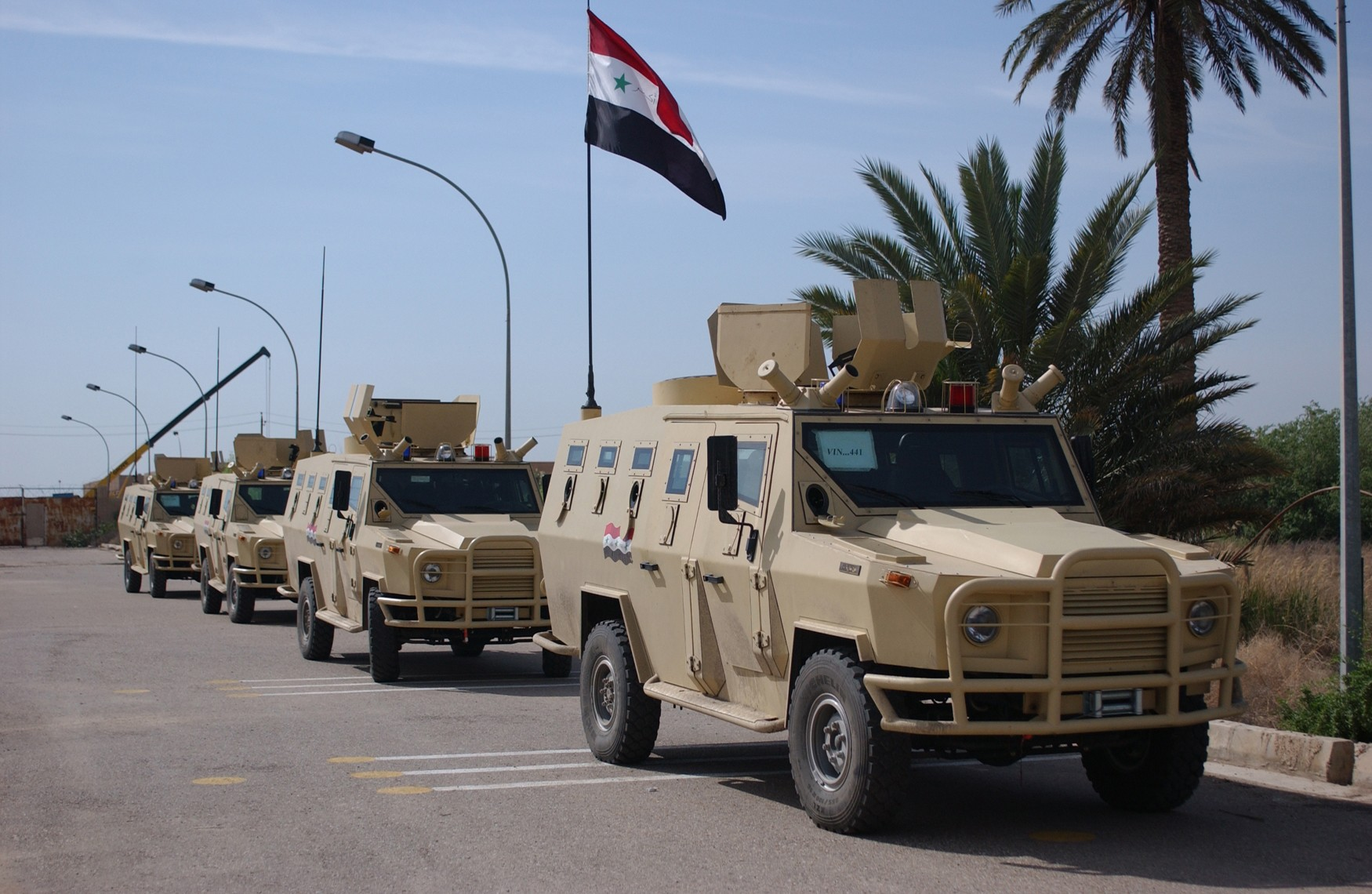
Iraqi Dzik-3s.

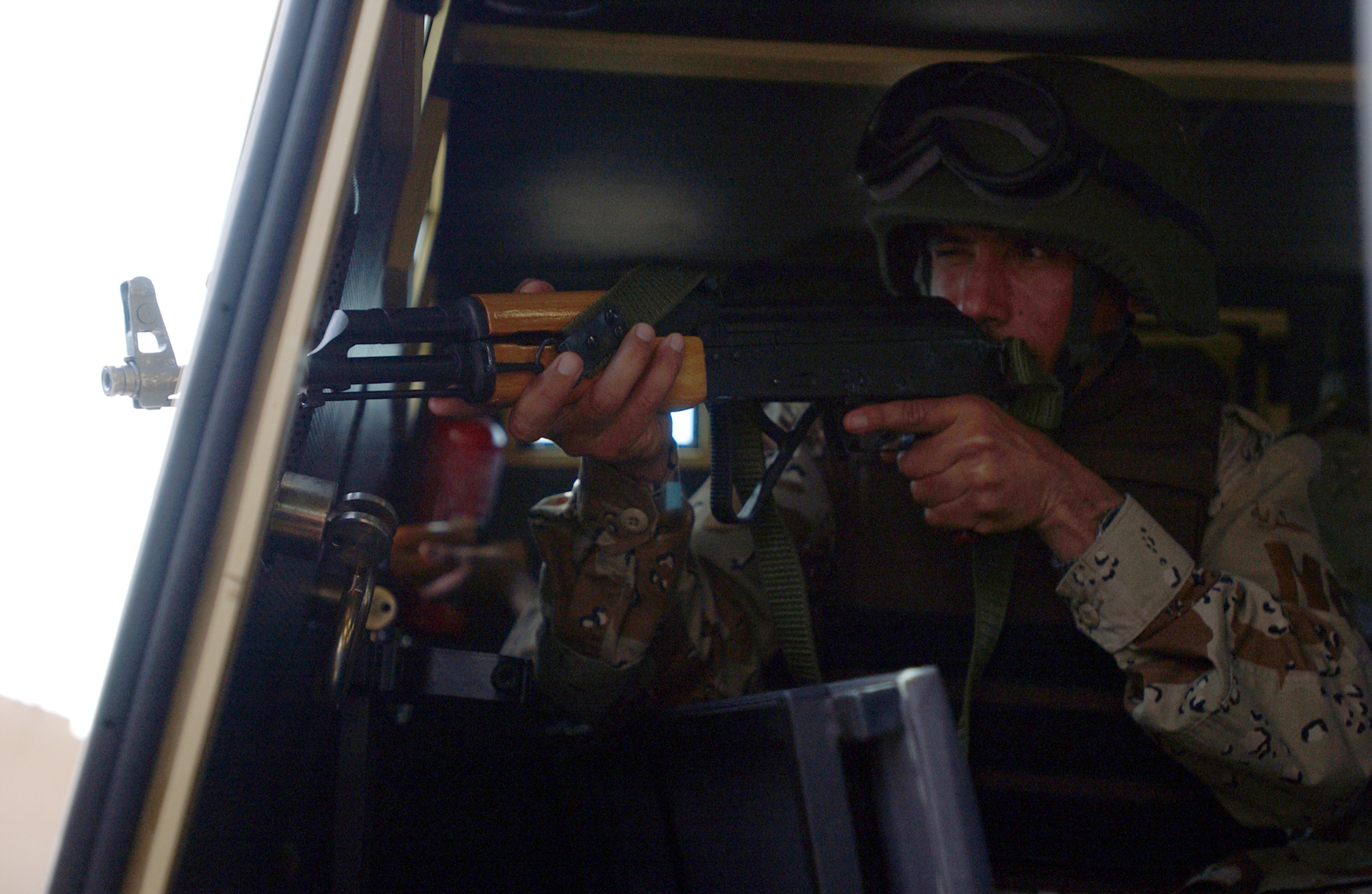
Firing ports of the Dzik-3.

== See also ==
- Tur (military vehicle)
