= AMZ-Kutno =

Polish automotive manufacturer

AMZ Kutno S.A.
- Company type: Joint stock company
- Industry: Automotive, defence
- Founded: 1999; 27 years ago
- Headquarters: Kutno, Kutno, Łódź, Poland
- Area served: Europe
- Products: Special vehicles, armoured fighting vehicle
- Number of employees: <380
- Website: amz.pl

AMZ Kutno is an automotive company based in Kutno, Poland, that has been operating since 1999. It specializes in the design and manufacture of special bodies for commercial vehicles, such as minibuses, ambulances, security vans and special vehicles for the uniformed services. The company also produces a line of city buses and various military vehicles.

== Military products ==
- adaptation of Wolverine on a medical evacuation vehicle,
- adaptation Scam SM55 command vehicle,
- adaptation Scam SM55 for laboratory chemicals.

For most vehicles produced in the AMZ-Kutno armored cars are:

- Dzik (Boar) I/II/III,
- Tur I,
- Tur II,
- Żubr

The Boar is produced in three versions for Polish uniformed services and export to Iraq. By February 2008 there were more than 600 units sold. In 2007 it joined the Tur I model in production, while in the 2008 model year they introduced the Zubr and Tur II models.

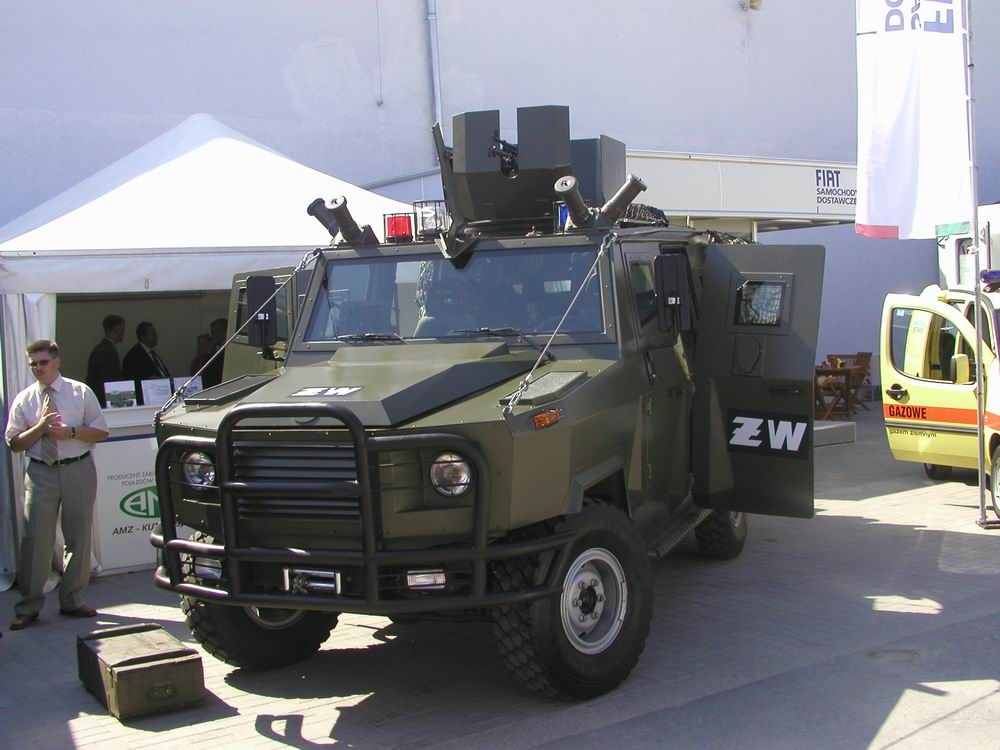
AMZ Dzik 2 of the Polish Army Military Police at Kielcach

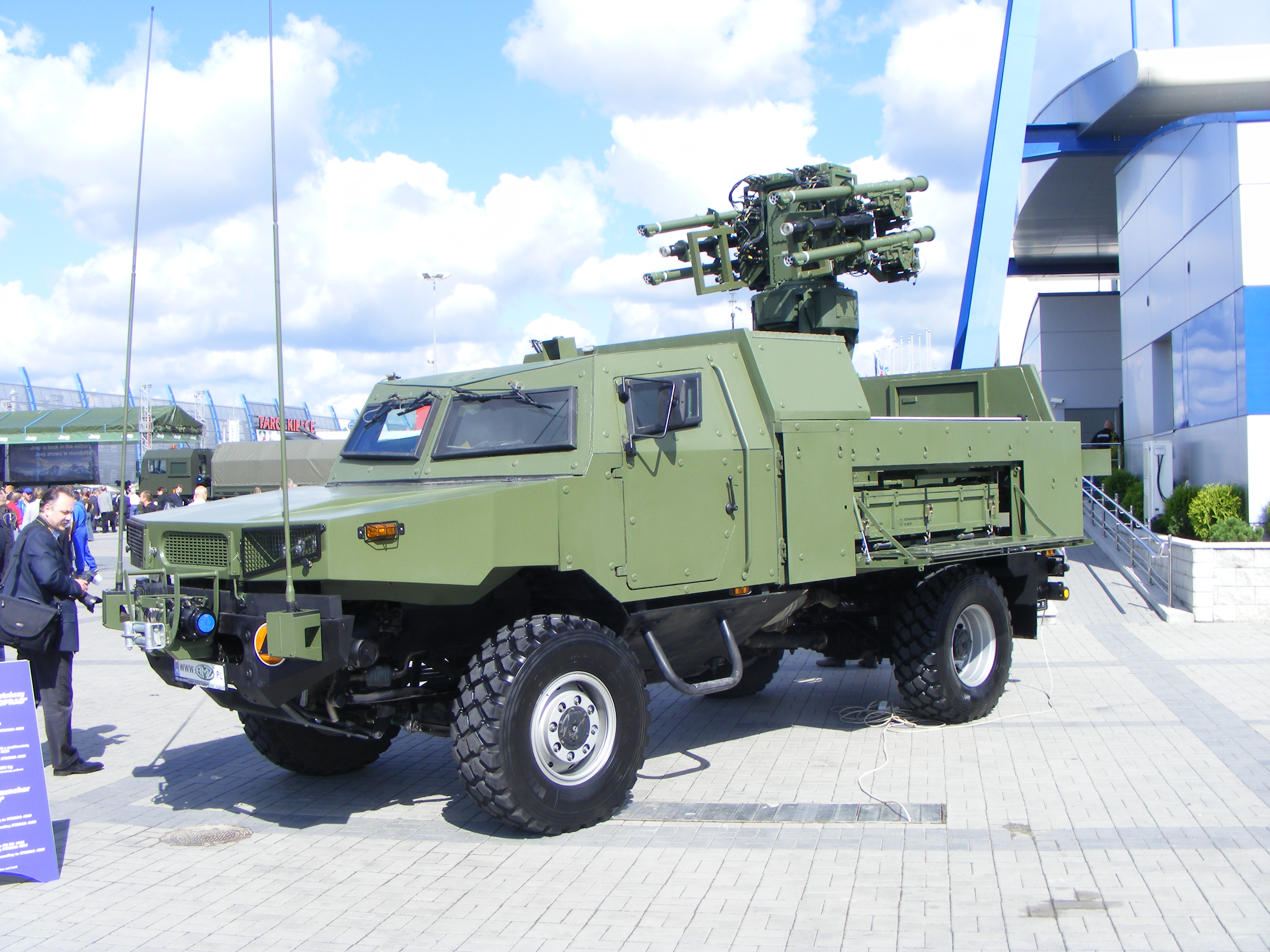
AMZ Żubr P

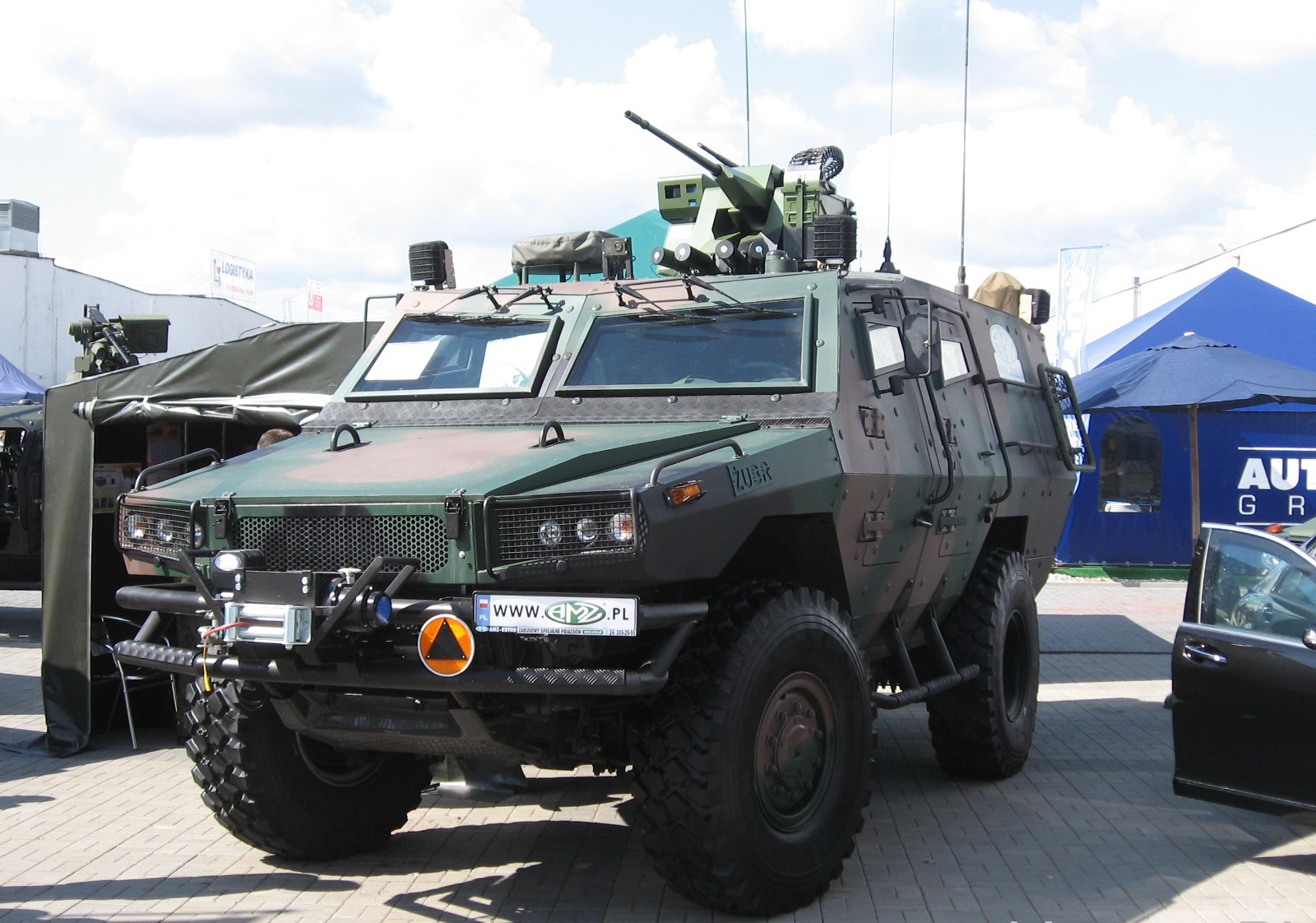
AMZ Żubr WD with weapons mount

== Civil products ==
Minibus chassis have been produced since 2001. AMZ Kutno minibuses use chassis from Ford, Iveco, Mercedes-Benz, Opel, Renault, and Volkswagen. Initially, only conversions were performed on buses. Over time, AMZ Kutno started to produce buses with their own, original construction on chassis vans or trucks.

After initial growth, the production of buses began to decrease, due to the transfer of some employees to produce the model Dzik for Iraq. Bus sales in Poland were as follows: 2003 - 60 units, 2004 - 79 units, 2005 - 56 units, 2006 - 39 units, 2007 - 27 units. Export began in 2005. In subsequent years, it was: 2005 - 7 units, 2006 - 24 units, 2007 - 2 units.

Bus models:

- AMZ City Smile CS10E - electric city bus
- AMZ City Smile CS10LF - low floor city bus
- AMZ City Smile CS12LF - low floor city bus
- AMZ City Smile CS12 Electric - electric city bus
- AMZ LT46M - urban bus, based on VW LT46
- AMZ Transit - minibus, based on Ford Transit
- AMZ 50C13/15 - minibus, based on Iveco Daily 50C13/50C15
- AMZ 65C15 - minibus, based on Iveco Daily 65C15
- AMZ Vario - minibus, based on Mercedes-Benz Vario
- AMZ Movano - minibus, based on Opel Movano
- AMZ Master - minibus, based on Renault Master
- AMZ Sprinter RTW - based on Mercedes-Benz Sprinter
- AMZ Crafter 50 - custom body on a Volkswagen Crafter chassis
- AMZ 65C15 Ramzar - minibus, custom body on an Iveco Daily 65C15 chassis
- AMZ Boomerang - coach, custom body on a Renault Midlum chassis
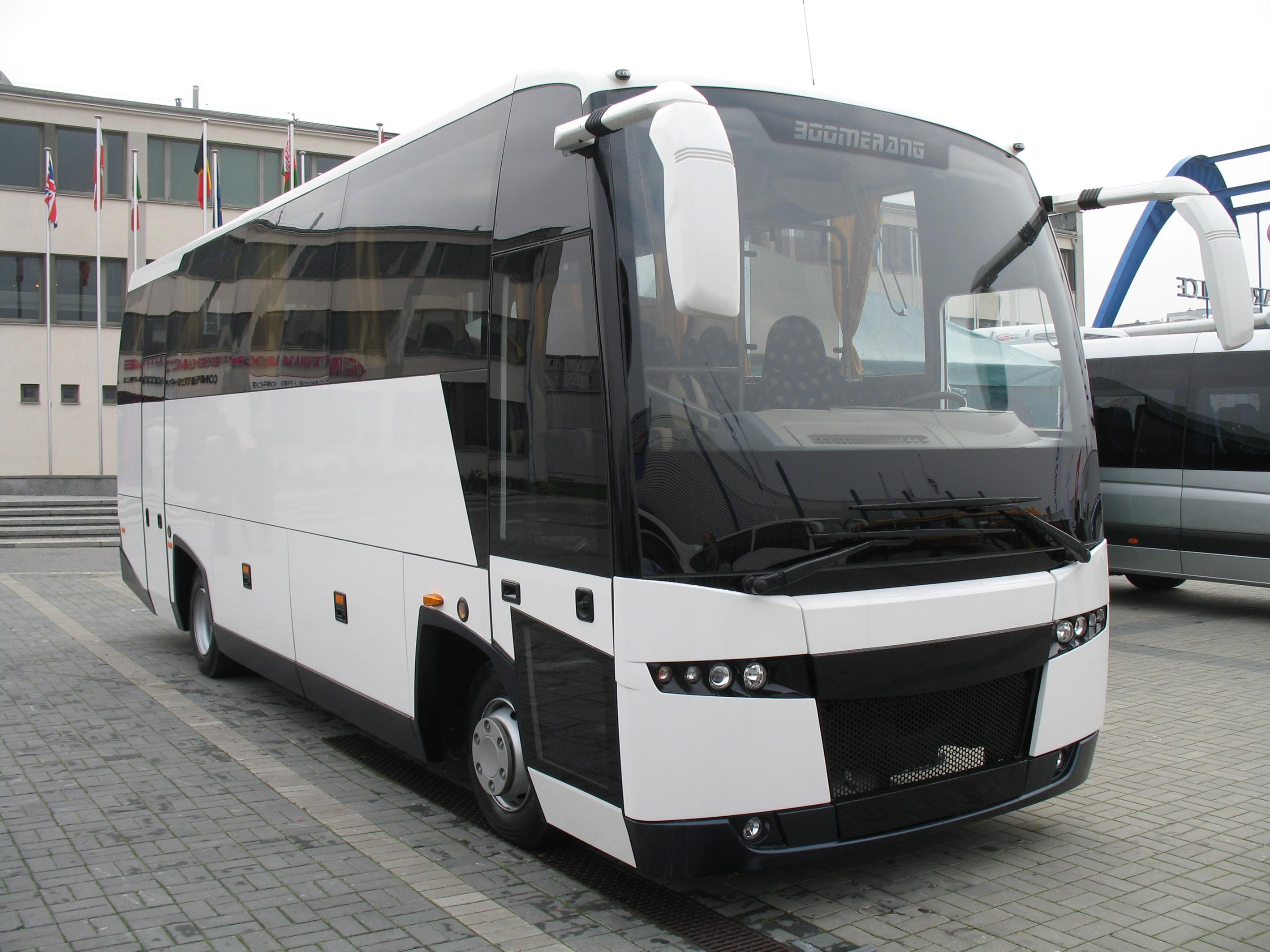
AMZ Boomerang Autobus on display Transexpo 2008

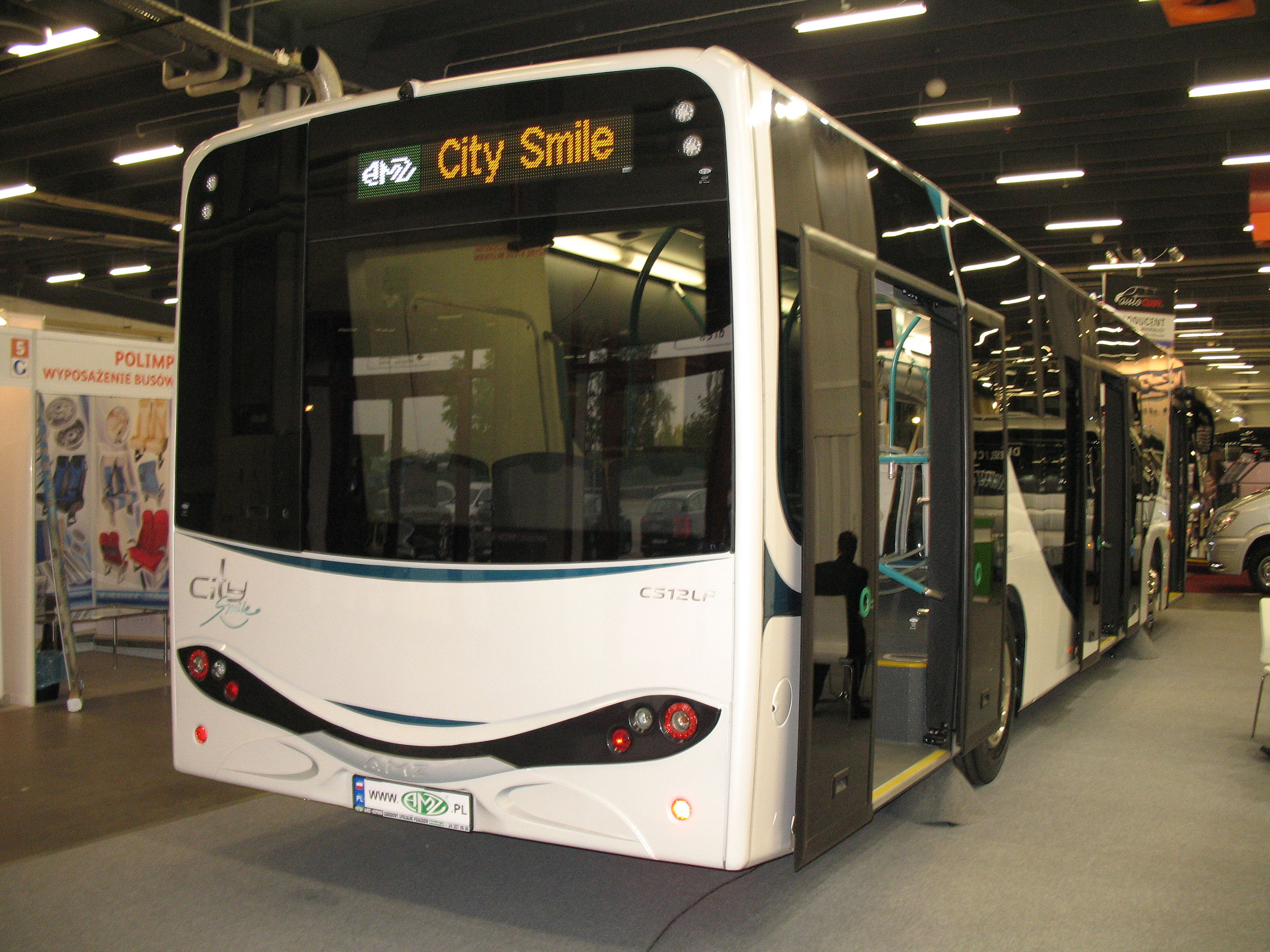
City bus AMZ City Smile

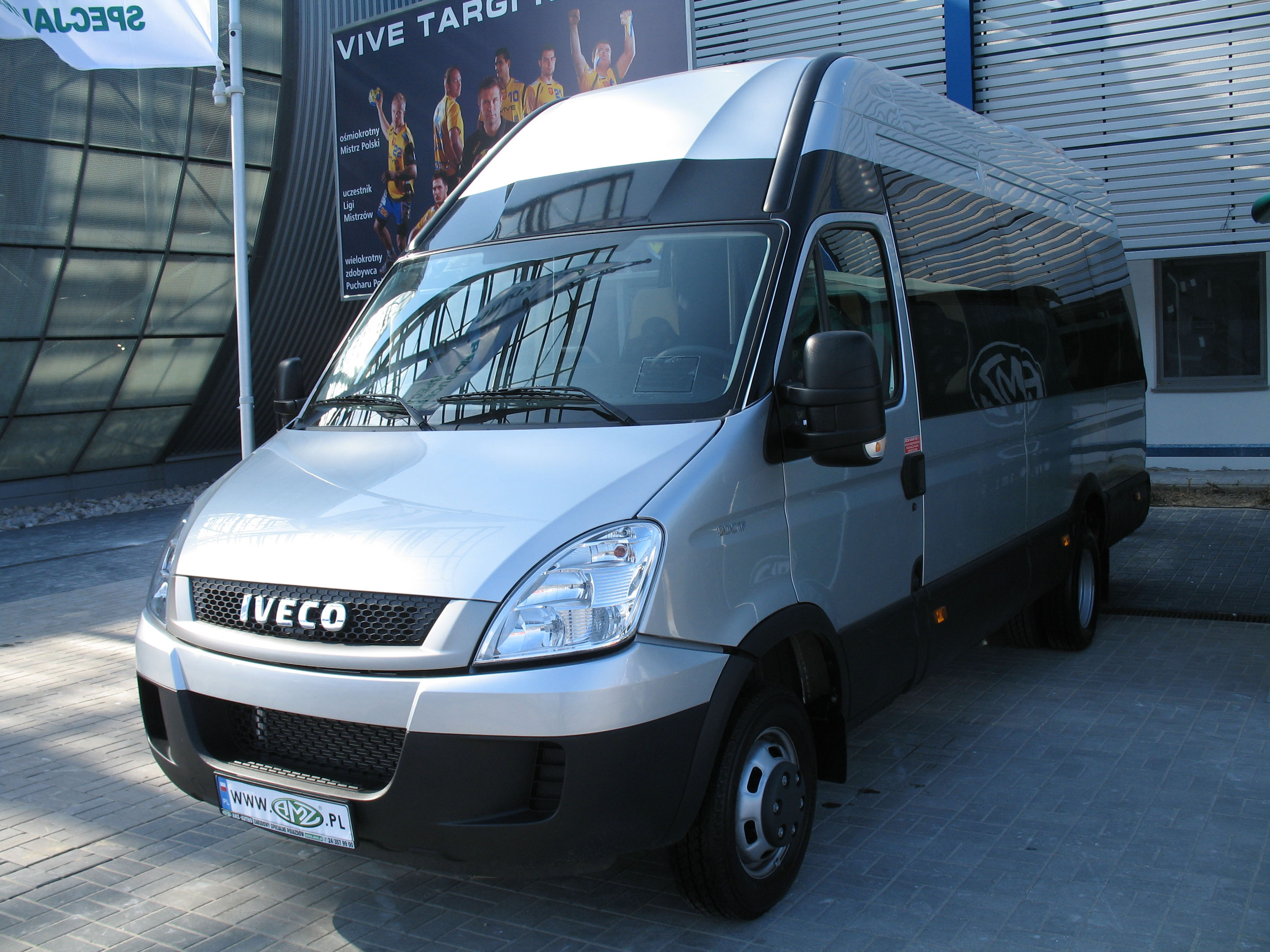
AMZ Iveco Daily

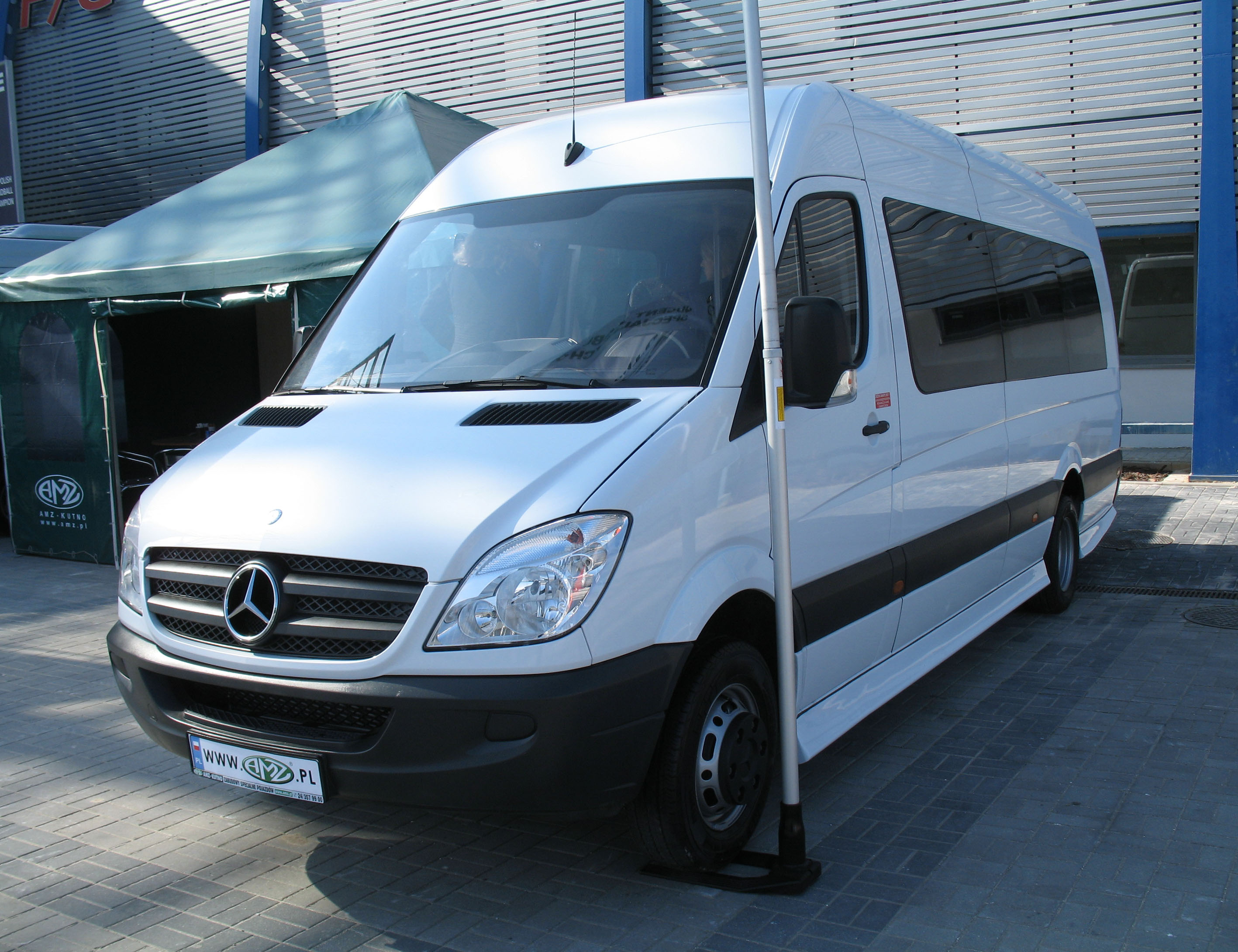
AMZ Mercedes-Benz Sprinter

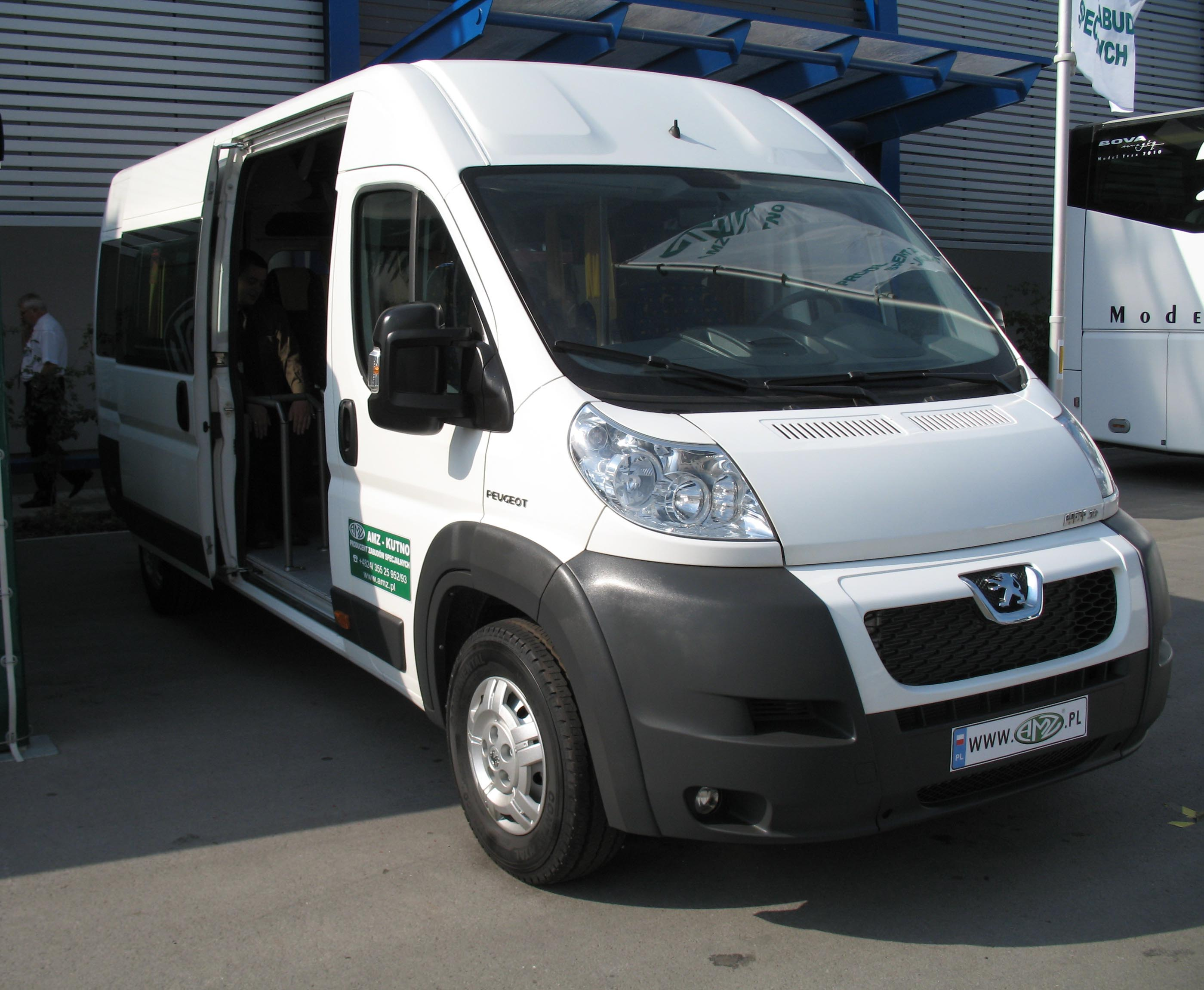
AMZ Peugeot Boxer

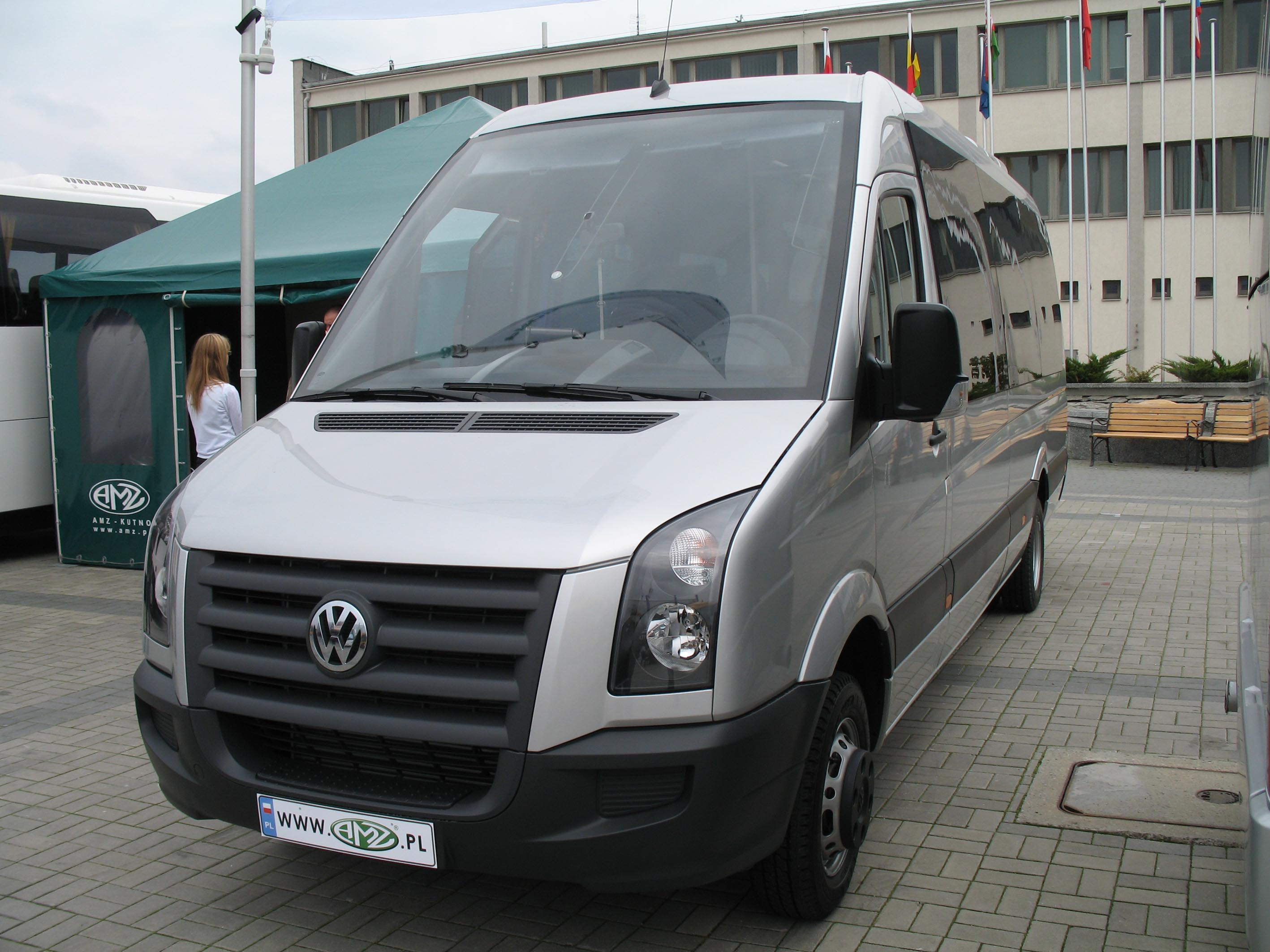
AMZ Volkswagen Crafter

== Employment ==
At the end of 2006 onwards, the company employed about 350 people. In 2008 the number had risen to more than 400 employees.

== References/Sources ==
- AMZ . AMZ. [w:] Ciężarówki Świata 2007, Nr 1 (15) 2007, s. 82. [in] 2007 World Trucks, No 1 (15) 2007, p. 82.
- Hołdanowicz G., Dzik - propozycja na czasie . Hołdanowicz G., wild boar - the proposal on time. [w:] "Raport Wojsko Technika Obronność", nr 11, 2004 . [in:] "Report of the army of Defense Technology", No. 11, 2004.
- Hołdanowicz G., Dzik 2 w Sulejówku i Wilnie . Hołdanowicz G., Dzik 2 Sulejówku and Vilnius. [w:] "Raport Wojsko Technika Obronność", nr 4, 2005 . [in:] "Report of the army of Defense Technology", No. 4, 2005.
- Hołdanowicz G., W Kutnie pojawił się Tur . Hołdanowicz G., appeared on The Kutno Tur. [w:] "Raport Wojsko Technika Obronność", nr 3, 2007, s. 44-46. [in:] "Report of the army of Defense Technology, No. 3, 2007, p. 44-46.
- Kiński A., Dzik-3 dla Iraku . Kinski A., Dzik-3 Iraq. [w:] " Nowa Technika Wojskowa ", nr 8, 2005 . [in] "New Military Technology", No. 8, 2005.
- Orłowski L., Samochód patrolowo-interwencyjny Dzik . Orłowski L., car-patrolowo intervention Dzik. Wyd. Ed. Bellona, Warszawa 2006, ss. 32. Bellona, Warsaw 2006, pp 32. Seria: Typy Broni i Uzbrojenia 222, ISBN 83-11-10492-1 Series: Types of Weapons and Armaments 222, ISBN 83-11-10492-1
