= List of equipment of Polish Territorial Defense Forces =

Territorial Defence Forces
- Wojska Obrony Terytorialnej
- Military eagle
- Founded: 2017; 9 years ago
- Country: Poland
- Role: Light infantry
- Size: 40,00 (2025)
- Part of: Polish Armed Forces

The following is a List of equipment used by the Territorial Defense Forces of the Polish Armed Forces. Not to be confused with the equipment of the Polish Armed Forces, Navy, air force or Polish Land Forces.

== Personnel equipment ==
=== Handguns ===
Image	Model	Type	Origin	Quantity
	Pistolet VIS 100	9 × 19 mmParabellum	Poland	~3000
	Pistolet WIST-94	9 × 19 mmParabellum	Poland	

=== Assault rifles ===
Image	Model	Type	Origin	Quantity
	FB MSBS Grot	5,56 × 45 mm	Poland	pow. 34000
	FB Beryl	5,56 × 45 mm	Poland	

=== Sniper rifles ===
Image	Model	Type	Origin	Quantity
	Bor rifle	7,62 × 51 mm NATO	Poland	~310
	Sako TRG M10	.338 Lapua Magnum	Finland	87

=== Machine guns ===
Image	Model	Nabój	Origin	Quantity
	UKM-2000	7,62 × 51 mm NATO	Poland	~2494

== Explosive weapons ==
=== Rocket-propelled grenade ===
Image	Model	Type	Origin	Quantity
	RPG-7	Rocket-propelled grenade	Soviet Union	

=== Mortars ===
Image	Model	Type	Origin	Quantity
	LMP-2017	Mortar	Poland	500

Anti-tank guided missile

Image	Model	Type	Origin	Quantity
	FGM-148F Javelin	Anti-tank guided missile	United States	60 lanuches 180 missiles

=== Loaders ===
Image	Model	Variant	Origin	Type	Quantity
	SŁ-34	SŁ-34C	Poland	Loader	
	UMI 9.50	UMI 9.50	Poland	Loader	

=== Trucks ===
Image	Model	Origin	Type	Quantity
	Jelcz 442.32	Poland	Truck	
	Jelcz 662	Poland	Truck	
	Star 266M, Star 266M2	Poland	Truck	
	Jelcz 862	Poland	Multilift MK IV self-loading kit, Multilift MK IV self-loading kit with a Hiab high-capacity crane	
	Jelcz P662 CW-10	Poland	Fuel truck	
	Star 266	Poland	mobile technical security workshops truck	

=== Off-road vehicles ===
Image	Model	Origin	Type	Quantity
Off-road vehicles
	Ford Ranger XLT	United States	Off-road vehicle	
	Tarpan Honker	Poland	Off-road vehicle	
	Volkswagen Transporter	Germany	Van	
	Volkswagen Crafter	Germany	Van	
Quad / motorcycles
	TGB Blade	Taiwan	Quad	
	TGB 1000i LT	Taiwan	Quad	
	Kawasaki LE 650 Versys	Japan	motocycle	
	Arctic Cat	United States	Quad	
	Polaris 570	United States	Quad	
	Polaris Sportsman 800	United States	Quad	

== Ambulances ==
Image	Model	Origin	Type	Quantity
	Tarpan Honker S	Poland	Ambulance	
	IVECO Iveco 40-10WM	Italy/Poland	Ambulance	

== UAVs ==
Image	Model	Origin	Variant	Type	Quantity
	WB Electronics FlyEye	Poland	FlyEye 3.0	Unmanned aerial vehicle ISTAR Intelligence, surveillance, and reconnaissance	18 sets 72 drones
	WB Electronics Warmate	Poland	Warmate 1	Loitering munition	a total of 10 sets (100 drones) purchased for Territorial Defence Forces, Special Forces and Operational Forces

== See also ==
- List of equipment of the Polish Land Forces
- List of equipment of Polish Special Forces
- List of equipment of Polish Air Force
- List of ships of the Polish Navy
- Modernization of the Polish Armed Forces
