= UMI 9.50 =

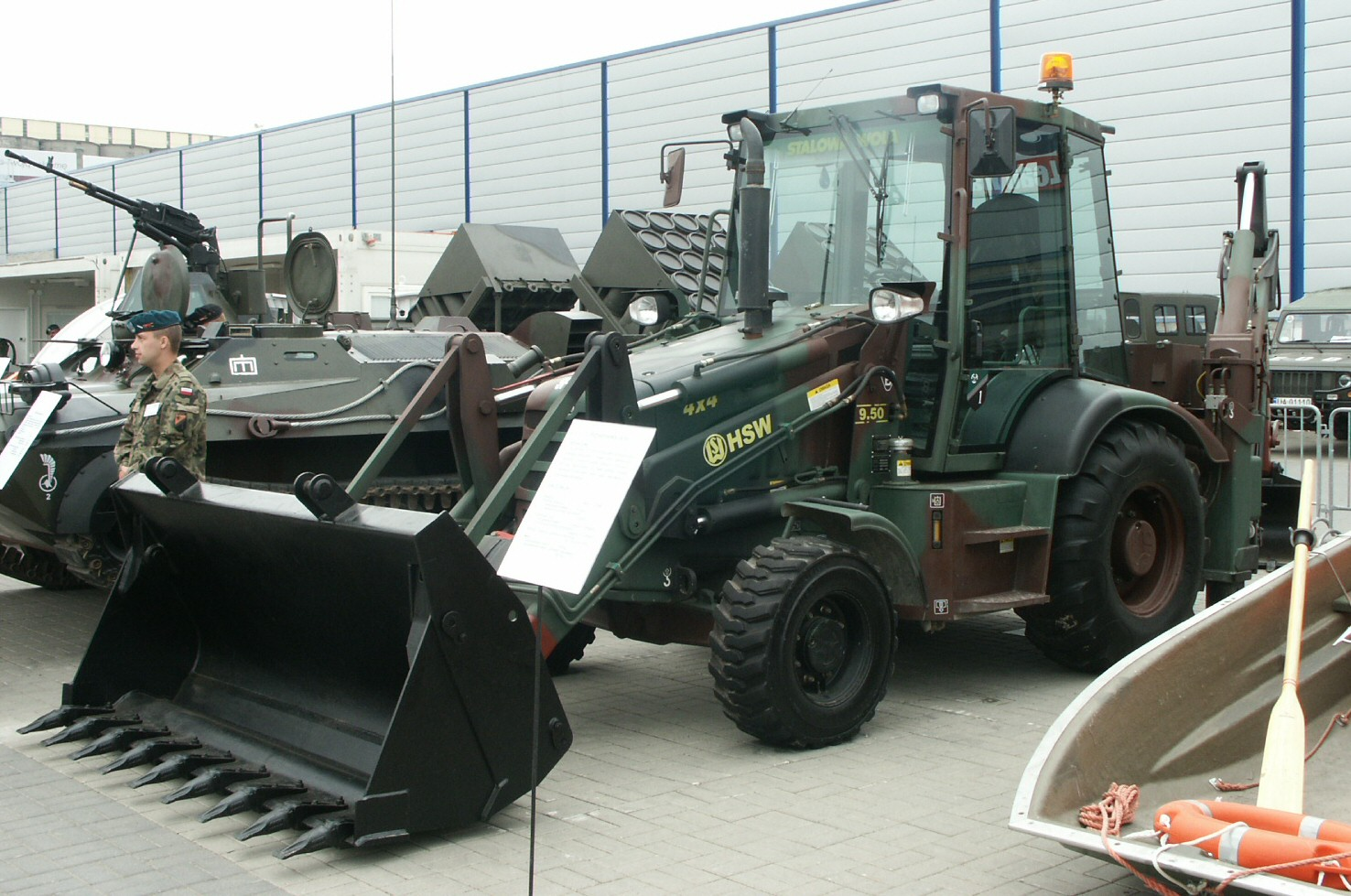
- UMI 9.50
- Type: backhoe loader
- Place of origin: Poland

Service history
- Used by: See Operators

Production history
- Designer: Huta Stalowa Wola

Specifications

UMI 9.50 is a backhoe loader constructed for the Polish army, manufactured in Huta Stalowa Wola. In use since 2004. It can operate as an excavator, bulldozer, snowplough, sweeper, demolition hammer, or even an asphalt milling machine.

== Construction ==
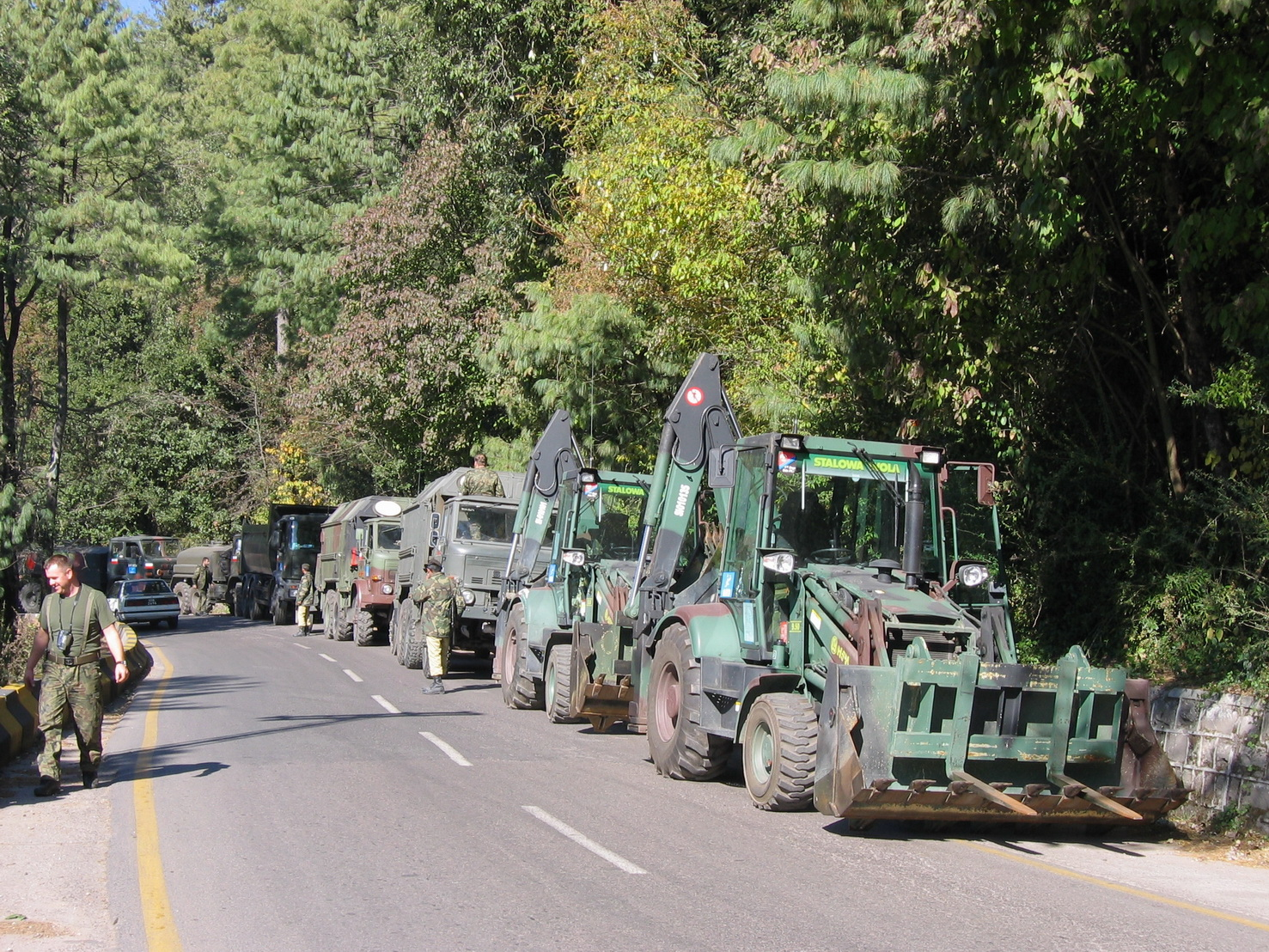
Polish Military Contingent in Pakistan during the humanitarian aid.

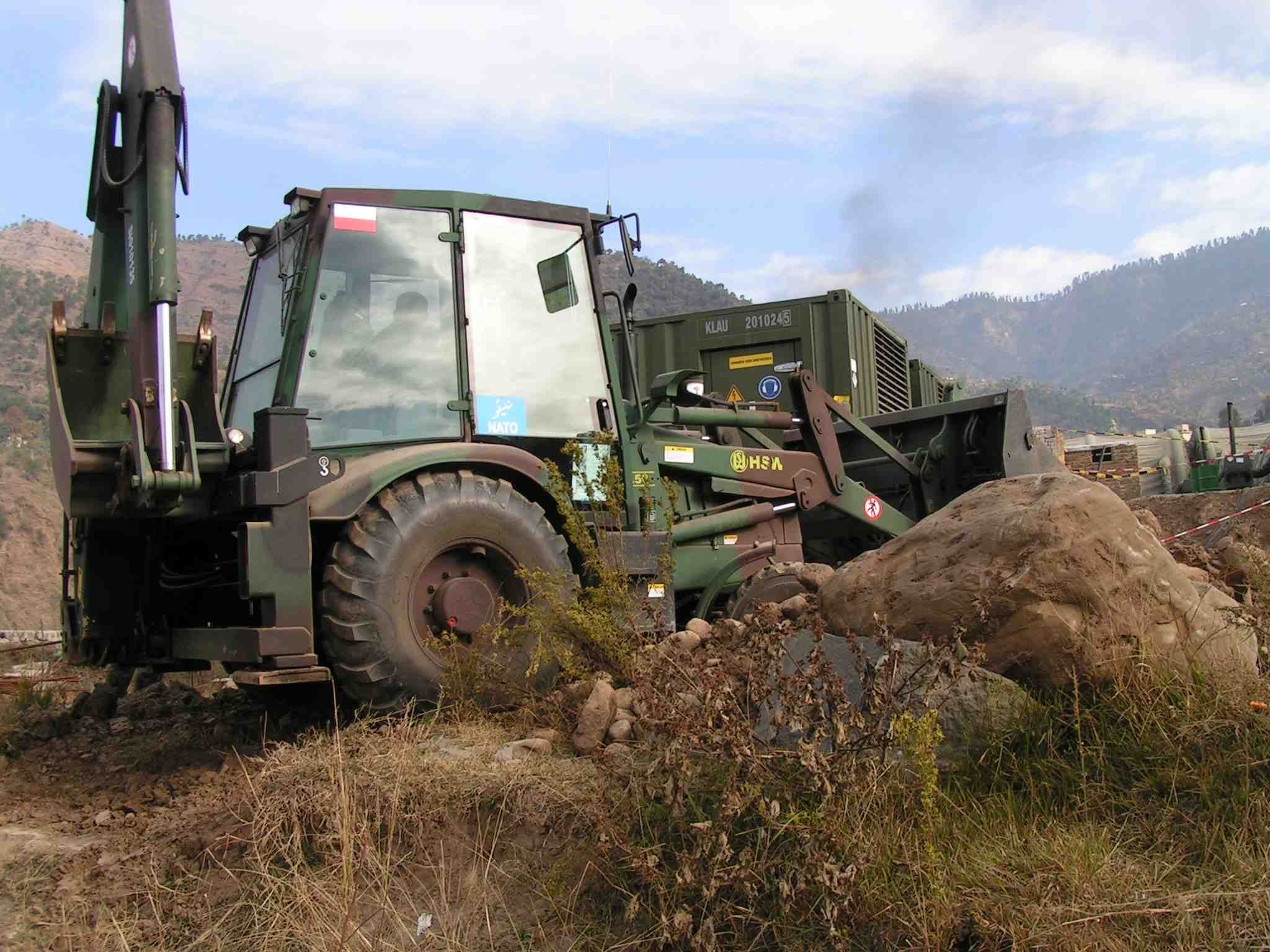
PKW in Pakistan

UMI 9.50 is a modernization of the machine, previously designated as model 9.50.

Compared to the previous design, the cabin has been enlarged, the front part has been modified by lowering the engine hood, which has improved the operator's observation. It has fully opening side windows and a lifting rear window. An electrohydraulically controlled excavator boom lowering lock has been installed, the operator can now turn it on and off without leaving the cabin. Additional lights have been used at the back to illuminate the excavator's working area, and the engine compartment has been silenced.

The machine is powered by a four-cylinder Iveco N45MSS turbocharged diesel engine with a displacement of 4.5 l, developing 99 HP at 2,200 rpm and a maximum torque of 400 Nm at 1,250 rpm.

The engine is coupled with an automatic four-speed gearbox, fully shiftable under load (Full Power Shift), electronically controlled, with the possibility of switching to semi-automatic mode. The drive system allows the machine to accelerate up to 39 km/h when driving forward and up to 22 km/h when driving backward.

The machine has four-wheel drive, drive axles with differential lock and a hydrostatic steering system.

It is equipped with a ROPS cabin mounted on rubber shock absorbers, with a soundproofing package. The standard equipment includes, among others, tinted windows, ventilation and heating system, a rotating operator's seat, suspended and adjustable with a seat belt, adjustable steering column, work lights (2 front and 4 rear), a warning lamp and a radio installation.

The machine can work continuously, with an average load of up to 10 hours. The time to change the machine from the transport position to the working position with any attachment is a maximum of 10 minutes.

The machine is adapted for air transport by Lockheed C-130 Hercules aircraft and for rail transport. In the transport configuration it does not exceed the road and rail gauge, i.e. weight 8850 kg, width 2.3 m and length 6280 mm.

== Specifications ==
Loader work equipment

- standard buckets with teeth or blade and forks,
- multi-purpose buckets with teeth or blade,
- snow blade
- hydraulic quick-hitch: buckets with teeth or blade, pallet forks, snow blade and sweeper.

Excavator attachments

- front-loading buckets with teeth,
- trapezoidal bucket,
- ditch-cleaning bucket,
- hydraulic hammer

Standard equipment

- excavator attachments (telescopic boom and bucket with teeth, capacity 0.2 m^{3}, width 700 mm)
- loader attachments (standard boom and multi-purpose bucket with teeth and tilting forks, capacity 1 m^{3})
- stabilisation supports, hydraulically controlled.

Backhoe attachments
Digging depth (telescope retracted/extended)	4760 – 5860 mm
Boom side shift	655 mm
Rotation angle	180 stopni
Breakout force on bucket teeth	58 kN
Hydraulic lifting capacity at 3 m (without bucket)	23 kN

Loader attachments
Max. dump height (bucket opening angle 45 degrees)	2700 mm
Breakout force	69 kN
Lifting capacity at ground level	50 kN
Lifting capacity at maximum lifting height	42 kN

== Operators ==
Current Operators

- Poland (75)
- In use by Polish Land Forces

== See also ==
- SŁ-34C
- Bożena 4 (anti-mine minesweeper)
