= M-98 mortar =

Polish-developed artillery weapon

M-98
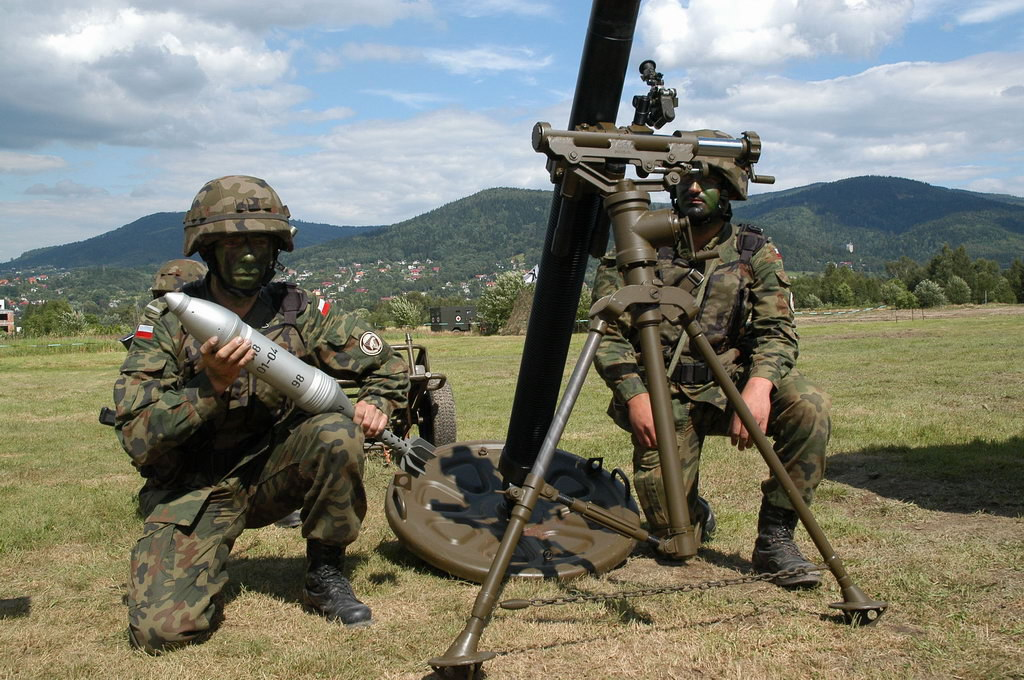
- Polish 98 mm mortar
- Type: mortar
- Place of origin: Poland

Service history
- Used by: Polish Land Forces

Production history
- Designer: Huta Stalowa Wola
- Designed: 1993-1997
- Produced: 2003 - present
- No. built: 99

Specifications
- Mass: 135 kg in combat position 300 kg in marching position

M-98 – Polish medium mortar, caliber 98 mm, towed, designed in the years 1993–1997 at the Research and Development Centre for Earth and Transport Machines in Stalowa Wola, since 2003 produced by Huta Stalowa Wola; ammunition for the mortar is produced by Zakłady Metalowe Dezamet.

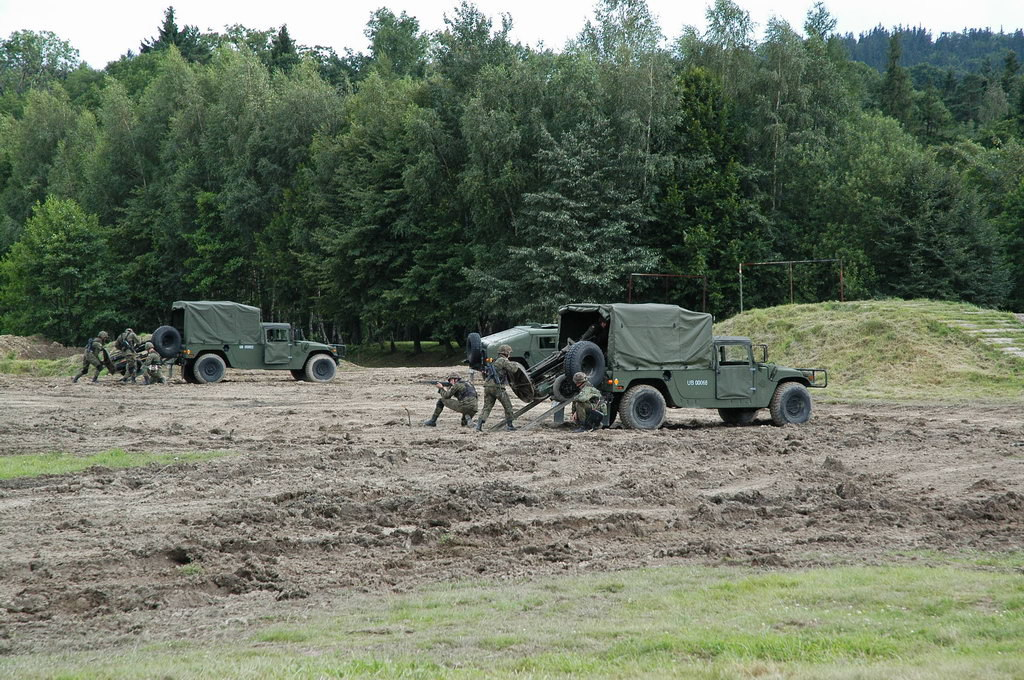
Soldiers of the 18th Bielsko Air Assault Battalion loading an M-98 mortar onto a Humvee vehicle

== Development ==
The 98 mm towed medium mortar was created as a result of Poland's signing of the Treaty on Conventional Armed Forces in Europe in 1991, which limited the number of artillery systems with a caliber above 100 mm to a maximum of 1,610. Work on the mortar, which would not violate the CFE-1 system and at the same time increase the capabilities of artillery forces, began in 1993 at the Research and Development Center for Earth Machinery and Transport in Stalowa Wola on the company's own initiative.. In 1994, a ballistic model was created, and in 1997, a mortar prototype was completed.

The M-98 mortar is the second 98 mm mortar design in the world, after the Slovak one (vz. 97).

In 2003, the Polish Army placed an order with Huta Stalowa Wola for the delivery of the M-98 mortar for the army. Delays in orders were caused by delays in developing ammunition. By 2005, approximately 60 units had been delivered. In 2022, there were 93 mortars in the Polish Army.

== Purpose ==
The M-98 mortar is used as the primary fire support unit of mechanized, airborne and mountain infantry units. Its purpose is to destroy combat forces, armored combat equipment, field fortifications, and command and fire assets.

The first mortars were received by the army in June 2003 and transferred to the 18th Bielski Air Assault Battalion. The M-98 is used by the 6th Airborne Brigade from Kraków, the 25th Air Cavalry Brigade from Tomaszów Mazowiecki and the 22nd Mountain Infantry Battalion from Kłodzko. The 6th Airborne Brigade battalions use 9 mortars in support companies. M-98 mortars were used by the Polish Military Contingent in Afghanistan.

The M-98 mortar is equipped with a transport cart, which is used for short-term transport. The M1097A2 HMMWV series vehicles are used for transporting it, while the crew and ammunition are transported by the M1025A2 or M1045A2 vehicle.

== Ammunition ==
The ammunition for this mortar is produced at the Dezamet mechanical plant:

- RAD-2 – cluster, containing 12 GKO high-explosive fragmentation submunitions.
- RAD-3 – fragmentation, containing approximately 4,000 fragments.

Lighting and smoke ammunition are also produced and used.

High-explosive fragmentation ammunition is produced by Zakłady Metalowe Mesko.

High-explosive fragmentation grenades weigh 10.1 kg.

In 1999, work was underway on an anti-tank missile designated RAD-1, but the missile never progressed beyond the conceptual stage.

The mortar can be fired by lowering the grenade into the barrel or by means of a firing mechanism.

== Operators ==
Poland

93 are currently operational. As of 2024 major repairs of M-98 mortars are carried out by Huta Stalowa Wola.

== See also ==
- LMP-2017
- LM-60

== Bibliography ==
- "Nowe pociski do moździerzy". polska-zbrojna.pl (in Polish).
- "Polski moździerz średni M-98". militarium75.blogspot.com (in Polish).
- Ryszard Woźniak, M-98, „Nowa Technika Wojskowa” nr?, s. 21–22
