= ISM Kroton =

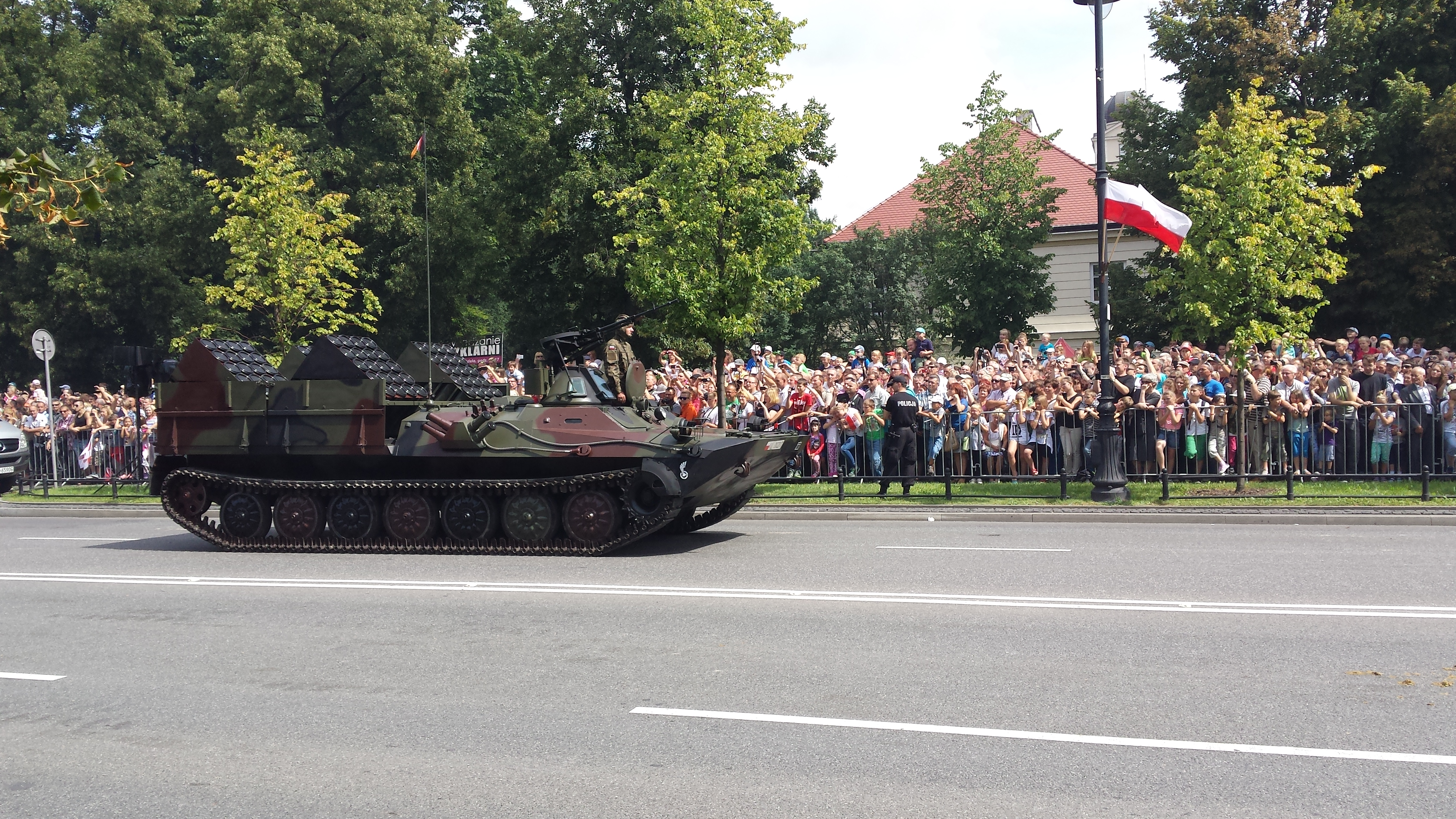
- Kroton during a military parade commemorating the Polish Army Day.
- Type: Minelayer
- Place of origin: Poland

Service history
- Used by: Polish Land Forces

Production history
- Manufacturer: Huta Stalowa Wola
- Developed from: Opal (armoured personnel carrier)
- Produced: 2004-2006
- No. built: 6

Specifications
- Length: 745 cm
- Width: 295 cm

Engineering Mining System (ISM) Kroton – Polish scattered mining system built on an adapted armored personnel carrier SPG-2A, designed for rapid placement of anti-tank or anti-personnel minefields by tactical-level engineering troops.

== Development ==
In 1993, the General Staff requested that the system, codenamed Kroton, be developed at the Military Institute of Engineering Technology in Wrocław. The SPG-2A transporter in an extended version with seven pairs of wheels was used as the chassis, in which the armored cabin and engine compartment were left, and four rotating launcher blocks were installed in the rear part. The model vehicle was built in 1994, and qualification tests were completed in 1995. Polish Armed Forces development plans were for 81 of these vehicles, but the program was put on hold in 1997 due to a shortage of funding.The Kroton vehicle was presented to the public in 2001 at the MSPO exhibition in Kielce. It was not until 2002 that the army ordered two test batches of scattered mine-laying vehicles. Some changes were made to the vehicle, including adding armoured foldable sides, and partially protecting the launcher blocks while providing platforms for the crew during reloading. In the summer of 2003, the modified prototype was completed and sent for testing.

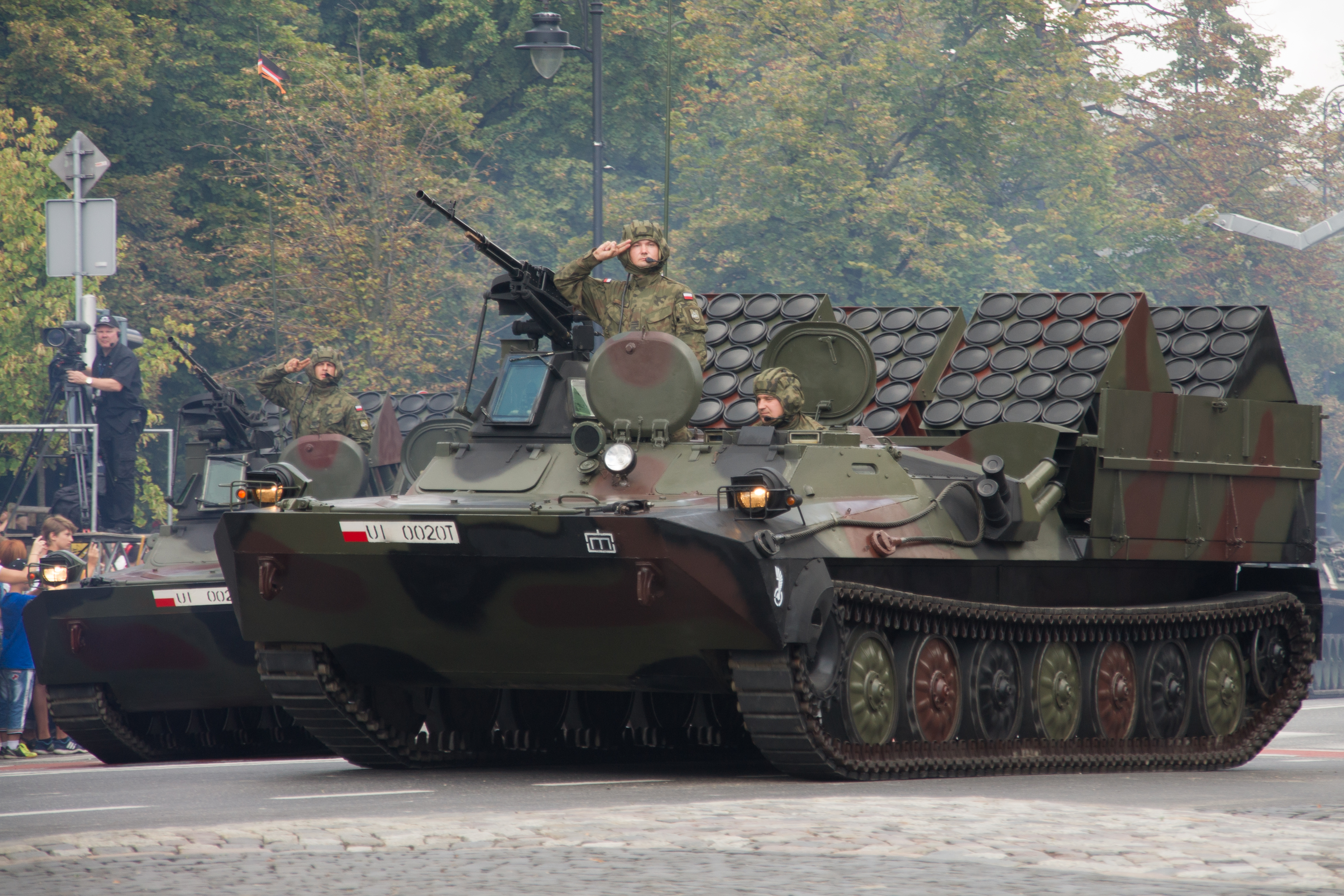
Kroton TMN

This system has not been introduced on a larger scale - until 2019, the Polish Army purchased and used only 6 Kroton TMN (Scattered Mine Laying Transporter). The first four were delivered between 2004 and 2006.

In 2005, Huta Stalowa Wola also developed a version on the Star 1466 wheeled chassis, with the same number of four mine launcher blocks.

The most commonly used anti-tank mine used by Polish armed forces is the MN-123, developed in 2004. It contains a double-sided warhead with an explosively formed penetrator that can penetrate 60 mm thick steel bottom armour. The mine is equipped with an electromagnetic fuse, and the cassette contains four mines with an instant fuse and one with a delayed fuse.

The next system to be implemented into more mass production is the Baobab-K Scattered Mining Vehicle moundted on the Jelcz 8×8 truck chassis. Developed also by Huta Stalowa Wola. 24 units are set to be delivered between 2026-2028.

== Specifications ==
- 400 anti-tank or anti-personnel mines, enabling the creation of a minefield measuring e.g. 60 by 600 meters in 15 minutes;
- in 4 sets of cluster mine throwers, 20 pcs each;
- each cluster mine contains five MN123.1 immediate-action mines and/or MN123.2 delayed-action mines, the mines can be thrown to the sides (at a distance of 0 to 90 m) and to the rear of the vehicle; the mass of the cluster is 22.8–23 kg;
- NSW 12.7 mm machine gun,
- ventilation device (with filters),
- heating device,
- manual or automatic fire protection system,
- day-night observation devices.
- X-ray signaling device,
- internal and external communication devices,
- contamination removal kit.

== Bibliography ==
- "Strona producenta pojazdu (Huta Stalowa Wola)". hsw.pl. Archived from the original on 2012-07-01.
- Strona producenta min i miotaczy TMN Bydgoskie Zakłady Elektromechaniczne „Belma”
- Kiński, Andrzej (2003). "ISM Kroton wkrótce w linii". Nowa Technika Wojskowa. Warszawa: Magnum-X.
