= M98 =

M98 or M-98 may refer to:

- Barrett M98B, a Bolt-action sniper rifle
- Gewehr 98, a German bolt-action rifle
- M98 (New York City bus), a New York City Bus route in Manhattan
- M-98 (Michigan highway), a former state highway in Michigan
- Messier 98, an intermediate spiral galaxy about 60 million light-years away in the constellation Coma Berenices
- M-98 mortar, a Polish mortar
