= Universal Track Carrier LPG =

LPG
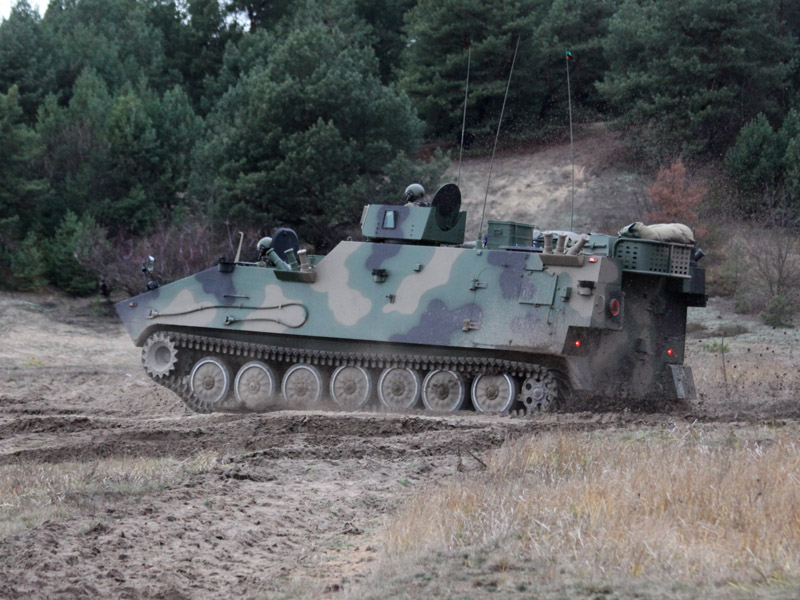
- Type: Armored personnel carrier
- Place of origin: Poland

Service history
- In service: 2010–present
- Used by: Poland; Ukraine
- Wars: Russian invasion of Ukraine

Production history
- Designed: 2009
- Manufacturer: Huta Stalowa Wola
- Produced: 2010–present

Specifications
- Mass: 16-18 tons
- Length: 7,37 m
- Width: 2,87 m
- Crew: 2+
- Operational range: 500 km
- Maximum speed: 60 km/h

The LPG (Polish: Lekkie Podwozie Gąsienicowe, Light Track Chassis), also named Universal Track Carrier, is Polish light armoured personnel carrier and weapon system chassis developed by Huta Stalowa Wola.

== History ==
The vehicle was designed in response to the need for a command vehicle for the Regina Divisional Fire Module of AHS Krab self-propelled gun-howitzers. Initially, in 2004, the Azalia fire control system command vehicle was built onto the KTO Ryś wheeled transporter, which was not, however, adopted in a wider scope into the armament of the Polish Armed Forces. In 2008, the Land Forces decided to use the rebuilt chassis of the withdrawn 2S1 Goździk self-propelled howitzers, previously manufactured by Huta Stalowa Wola (HSW) under a Soviet license, for the needs of command vehicles. The deep conversion of the vehicles was developed by the HSW Military Production Center in cooperation with the German company FFG (Flensburger Fahrzugbau GmbH), which developed the modern G4 powerpack drive unit (engine with gearbox and accessories), hydrostatic drive system and driver's station. This is how a vehicle was created, called by the manufacturer Lekkie Podwozie Gąsienicowe (LPG), also referred to as WD/WDSz from its first use.

The first LPG prototype was completed in 2009 and presented at the MSPO trade fair in September of that year. The following year, it was fitted with the command and staff version equipment, with which it successfully completed type tests in 2011. The first three command vehicles (the WDSz prototype and two WD) were handed over to the army on 30 November 2012, as part of the first AHS Krab howitzer division module. By 2017, the 11th Masurian Artillery Regiment had received 11 vehicles as a permanent unit (2 WDSz of the division commander and chief of staff and 9 WD of battery and fire platoon commanders). By 2024, another 44 vehicles are to be delivered, including 4 WDSz. By the end of 2021, a total of 37 vehicles had been delivered.

Several vehicles were transferred to the Ukrainian Armed Forces along with AHS Krab howitzers during the invasion of Russia in the spring of 2022.

In 2019, a demonstrator vehicle with hydropneumatic suspension from Horstman was presented for the M120G self-propelled mortar. Further development of the LPG assumes the use of an improved running gear with six road wheels instead of seven, with three supporting wheels on each side, and thus the abandonment of the 2S1 chassis elements in favor of newly made ones. This will increase the vehicle's weight from 18 to 21 tons, but at the same time the labor intensity and cost of manufacturing the vehicle will be reduced.

== Design ==
The vehicle's design is based on the chassis of the licensed self-propelled howitzers 2S1 Goździk manufactured by HSW. Its design uses the lower part, the so-called "bathtub", from the chassis of the withdrawn 2S1 howitzer purchased from the army, together with the road, drive and tensioning wheels, and the higher front plate and superstructure were newly made at HSW from 10 mm thick armour plates. The chassis has 7 pairs of road wheels. The suspension of the road wheels is independent, based on wishbones and torsion bars. The so-called "bathtub" was additionally reinforced from the inside with ARMOX steel armour and raised for the development of command vehicles or adapted for the installation of the Rak mortar turret system.

Introduced in the 1980s, the Russian 1 W12 Maszynek automatic artillery command vehicles, used in the Polish army, built on the seven-wheeled MT-LBu chassis, identical to the 2S1, were the "donor of organs" - elements of the running gear and suspension - for the new Light Tracked Chassis, also built on purchased 2S1 chassis with damaged running gear and suspension.

The biggest difference, in relation to the 2S1 prototype, apart from the appearance of the hull, is the drive system used. The drive is a liquid-cooled, 6-cylinder MTU 6V199 TE20 diesel engine with a power of 260 kW and a maximum torque of 1730 Nm. The drive unit is coupled to the LSG-1000 automatic transmission from ZF Friedrichshafen AG. The power pack is placed in the front of the vehicle, which improves crew safety and makes servicing easier. Despite its relatively low weight (16-17 t), the vehicle is not capable of floating. The chassis has the option of installing a turret system mounted in the rear part of the hull.

== Versions ==
Artillery Command Vehicle WD – a command vehicle on a tracked chassis. Artillery command vehicles are designed to carry out tasks related to preparing and directing fire, developing command points, obtaining and developing data on firing conditions and reconnaissance information necessary to hit enemy objects. These vehicles ensure independent operation of fire platoons in the command and fire control system. In the event of the destruction of the Command Vehicle of the support company commander, the Command Vehicles of the fire platoon commanders take over his tasks[10]. The vehicle is equipped with:

- Topaz computer-electronic fire control system[,
- on-board armament in the form of a 7.62 UKM-2000 machine gun mounted on a turntable (2000 rounds),
- observation devices for day and night observation for two crew members, including the commander[,
- filter-ventilation device and ABC weapon defense system,
- Obra-3C SSP-1C self-defense system with 12 81 mm grenade launchers,
- fire protection system in the engine compartment and explosion suppression system in the crew compartment,
- internal and external communication means and telecommunications equipment with a GPS receiver.

The vehicle is part of the Regina Divisional Fire Module (DMO) for AHS Krab gun-howitzers. The vehicle's hull provides ballistic protection at STANAG 4569 Level I.

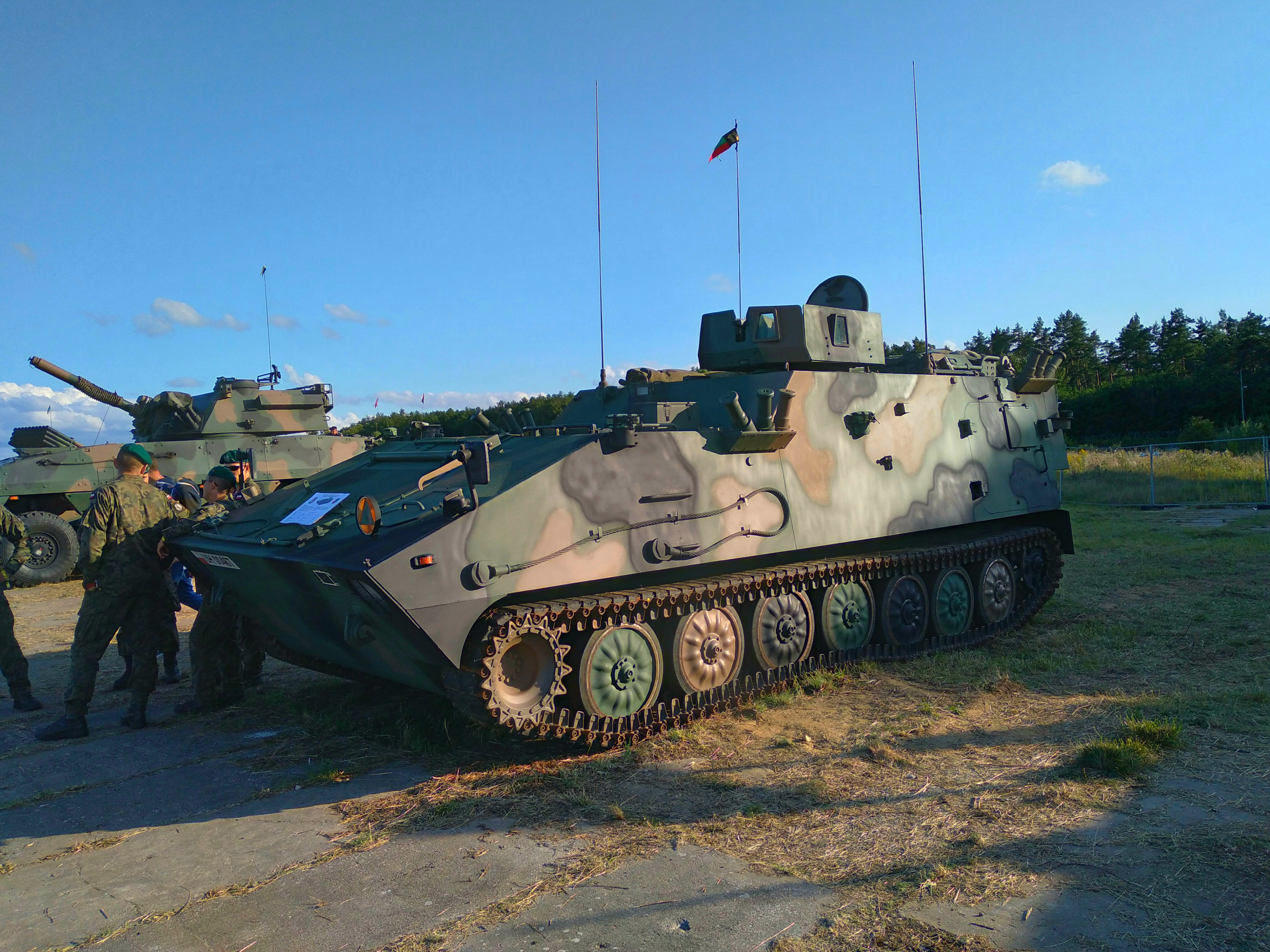
Command and Staff Vehicle WDSz

Command and Staff Vehicle WDSz – command and staff vehicle. Command and staff vehicles and command vehicles are designed to provide work places for the division commander, chief of staff, battery commander and fire platoon commander and their cooperating functionaries, to provide IT support for planning and decision-making processes in the division's command and fire control system, and to maintain communications. The vehicle is equipped with:

- an on-board power generator,
- a filtering and ventilation and air conditioning system,
- the Obra-3 SSP-1 vehicle self-defense system,
- the KIDDE-DEUGRA fire protection and explosion suppression system,
- on-board armament in the form of a UKM-2000 machine gun mounted on a turntable,
- two Air Top EVO 5500 heaters,
- an on-board set of FONET internal communication devices and external communication,
- telecommunication equipment with a GPS receiver,
- the Topaz computer-electronic fire control system.

The vehicle is part of the Regina Divisional Fire Module (DMO) for the AHS Krab gun-howitzers. The vehicle's hull provides ballistic protection at level I according to STANAG 4569.

M120G – a tracked carrier of a prototype of an automatically loaded 120 mm mortar.

Medical evacuation vehicle, tracked medical transporter.

== Users ==
- Poland
- Ukraine
