= Huta Stalowa Wola =

Polish defense contractor

Coordinates: 50°33′21″N 22°03′03″E

Huta Stalowa Wola S.A.
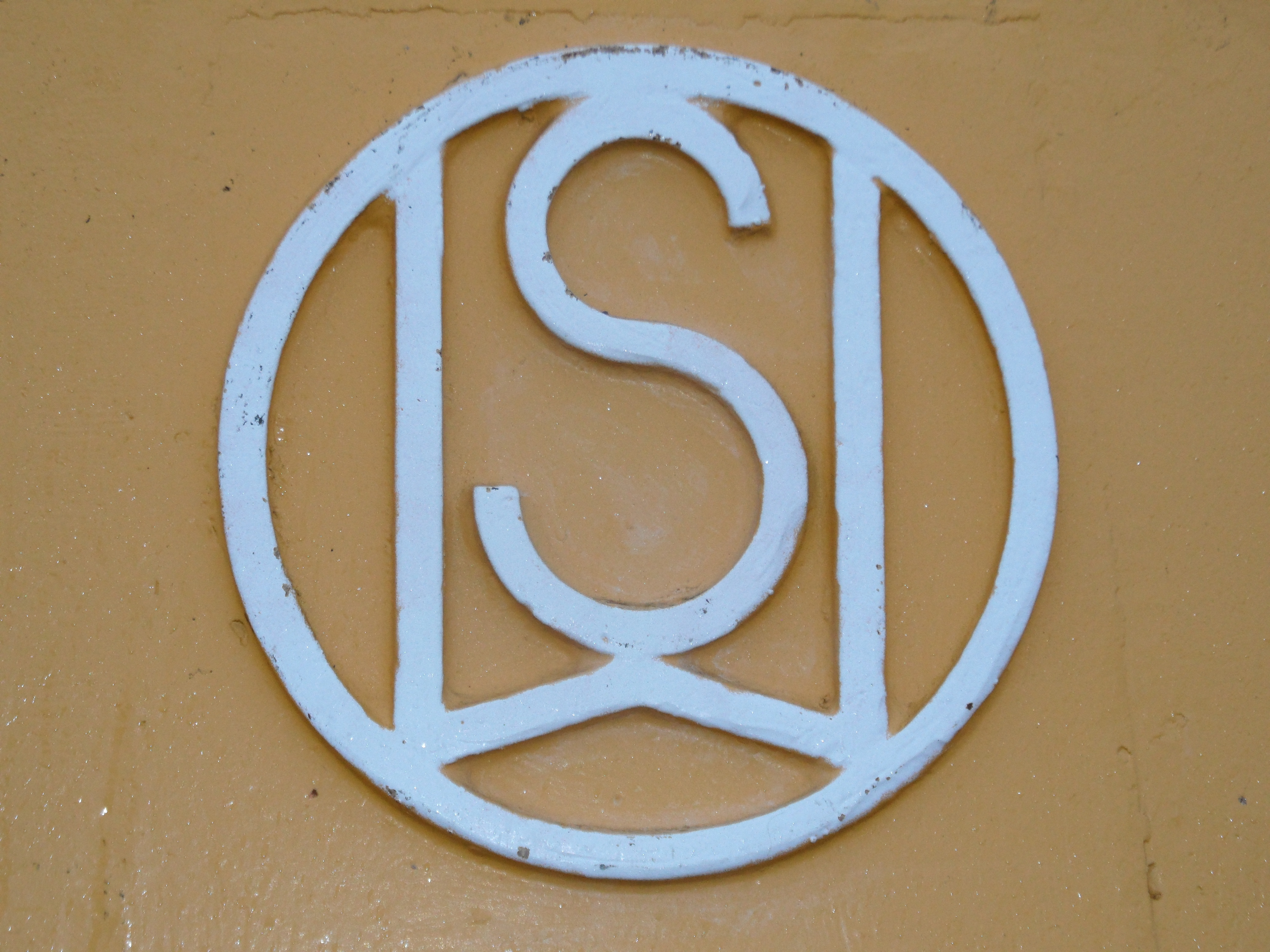
- Logo used since 1938
- Company type: Joint stock company
- Industry: Defense
- Founded: 1939
- Headquarters: ul. Gen. Tadeusza Kasprzyckiego 8, Stalowa Wola, Poland
- Key people: Wojciech Kedziera (President)
- Products: Artillery equipment, Special vehicles, Engineering equipment
- Total equity: 324 946 782,75 zł
- Parent: Polska Grupa Zbrojeniowa SA
- Subsidiaries: Jelcz Sp. z OO
- Website: www.hsw.pl/en

Huta Stalowa Wola (HSW SA) is a defense contractor that operates a steel mill in the city of Stalowa Wola, Poland. It is a major producer of military equipment and one of the largest heavy construction machinery producers in East-Central Europe.

In 1981 HSW and International Harvester constructed the TD-40 earth mover, the world's largest at that time. It had plough capacity 19 m^{3} and the engine had 460 hp. Production began in 1983. TD-40 was used by State Polish mines and was exported to USA, Czechoslovakia, and the Soviet Union. TD-40E variant is still produced under the "Dressta" name.

HSW SA is part of Polska Grupa Zbrojeniowa SA.

== History ==
It was established in 1938 in the Second Polish Republic. It was a part of a series of investments made by the Polish government from 1936–1939 to create the Central Industrial Region. This was to be a group of factories built in the middle of the country, away from the borders with Germany and the USSR. It was designed to provide a reasonably secure location for the production of armaments and high technology goods.

The mill manufactured high alloy steels and weapons – artillery and heavy machine guns – in 1937. A city grew around the mill, and took its name from the town of Stalowa Wola.

In the 1960s and 1970s the company started production of heavy construction machinery, and in the 1980s, it was one of the major centers of resistance to the government (see 1988 Polish strikes). In 1991 Huta Stalowa Wola became a joint stock company.

It is the town's major employer.

On 1 February 2012, HSW SA sold its civilian construction machinery division to Guangxi Liugong Machinery.

In 2012, HSW bought Jelcz-Komponenty Sp. z OO.

In 2014, the Ministry of State Treasury decided to include HSW in the recently established Polska Grupa Zbrojeniowa, headquartered in Radom, making it Poland's largest arms manufacturer.

In 2016, the expansion of the gun barrel manufacturing facility was completed to meet the needs of the AHS Krab self-propelled howitzer program, enabling the production of barrels up to 155 mm in caliber and up to 11 meters in length. As a result, HSW joined the select group of manufacturers in Western Europe with such capabilities.

In 2021, the Military Engineering Works in Dęblin merged with HSW.

In 2022, HSW acquired the Sanok-based bus and coach manufacturer Autosan.

In 2023, HSW purchased the civilian construction machinery part that it had sold to Guangxi Liugong Machinery including two production halls along with its employees. It was announced that this part of the company would switch to manufacturing military equipment.

== Shareholders ==
- Polska Grupa Zbrojeniowa S.A. – 86.09%
- The State Treasury – 5.63%
- PGE Obrót S.A. – 0.84%
- ORLEN S.A. – 0.66%
- Minority shareholders – 6.78%

== Current Products ==
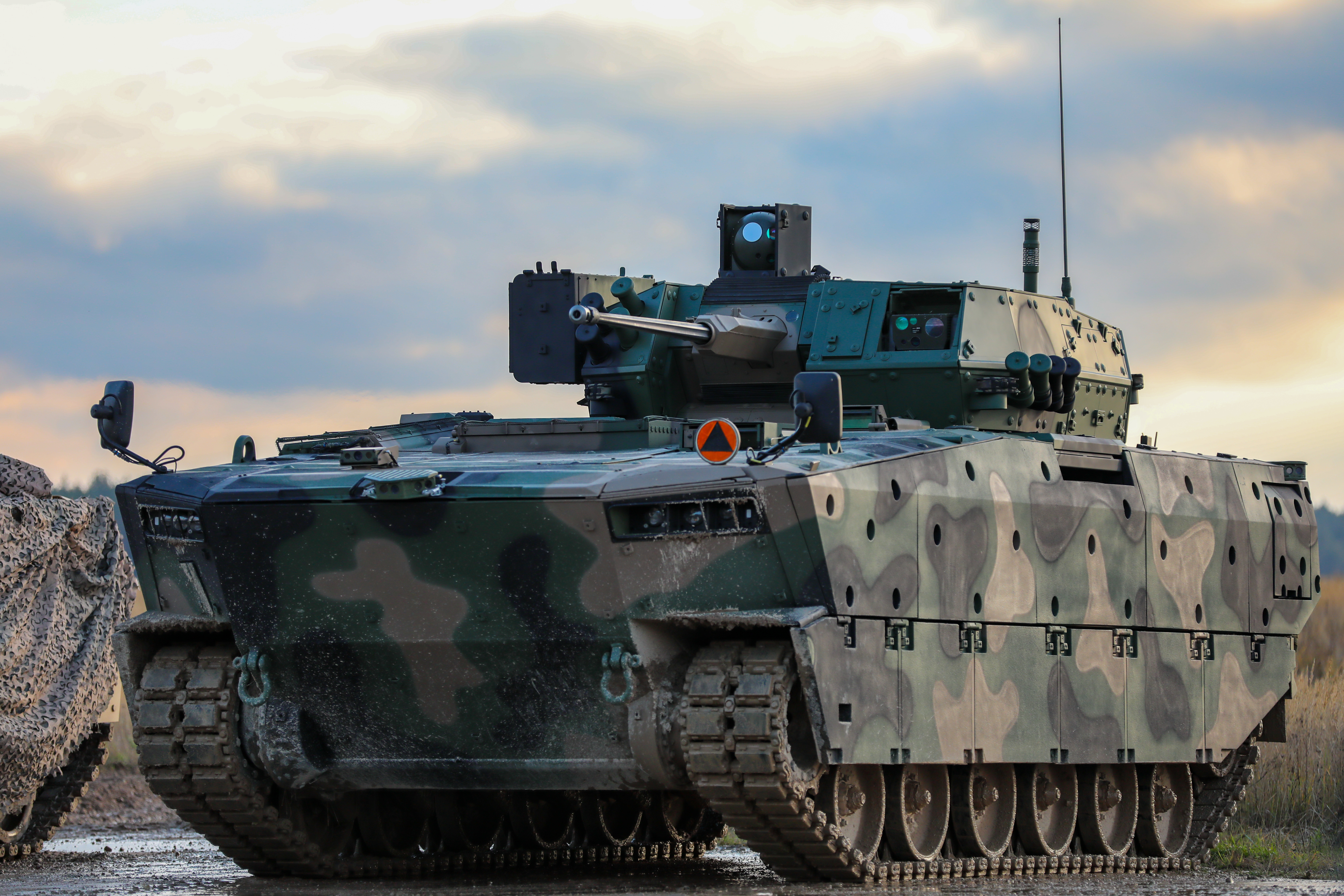
Borsuk (infantry fighting vehicle)

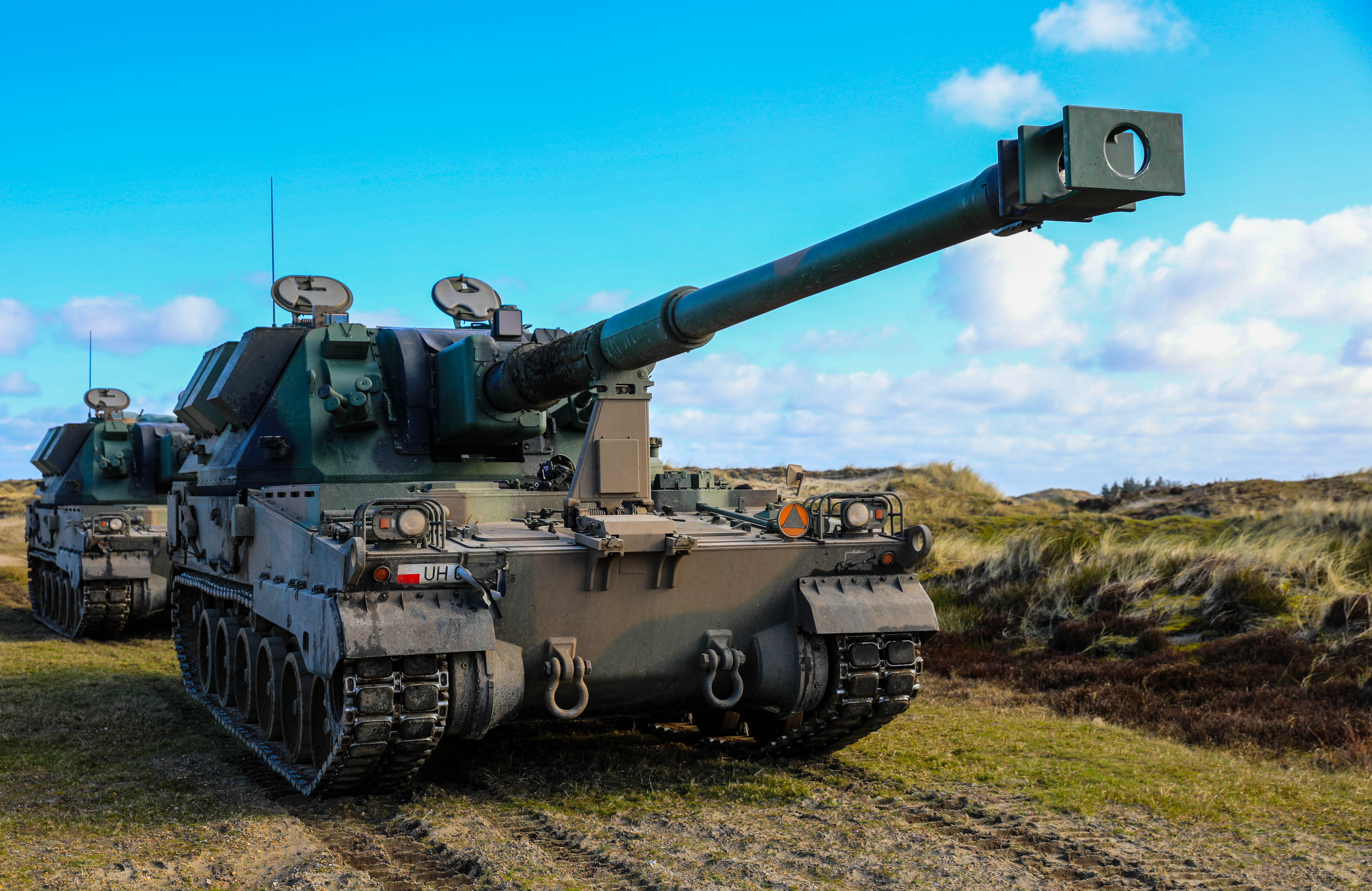
AHS Krab

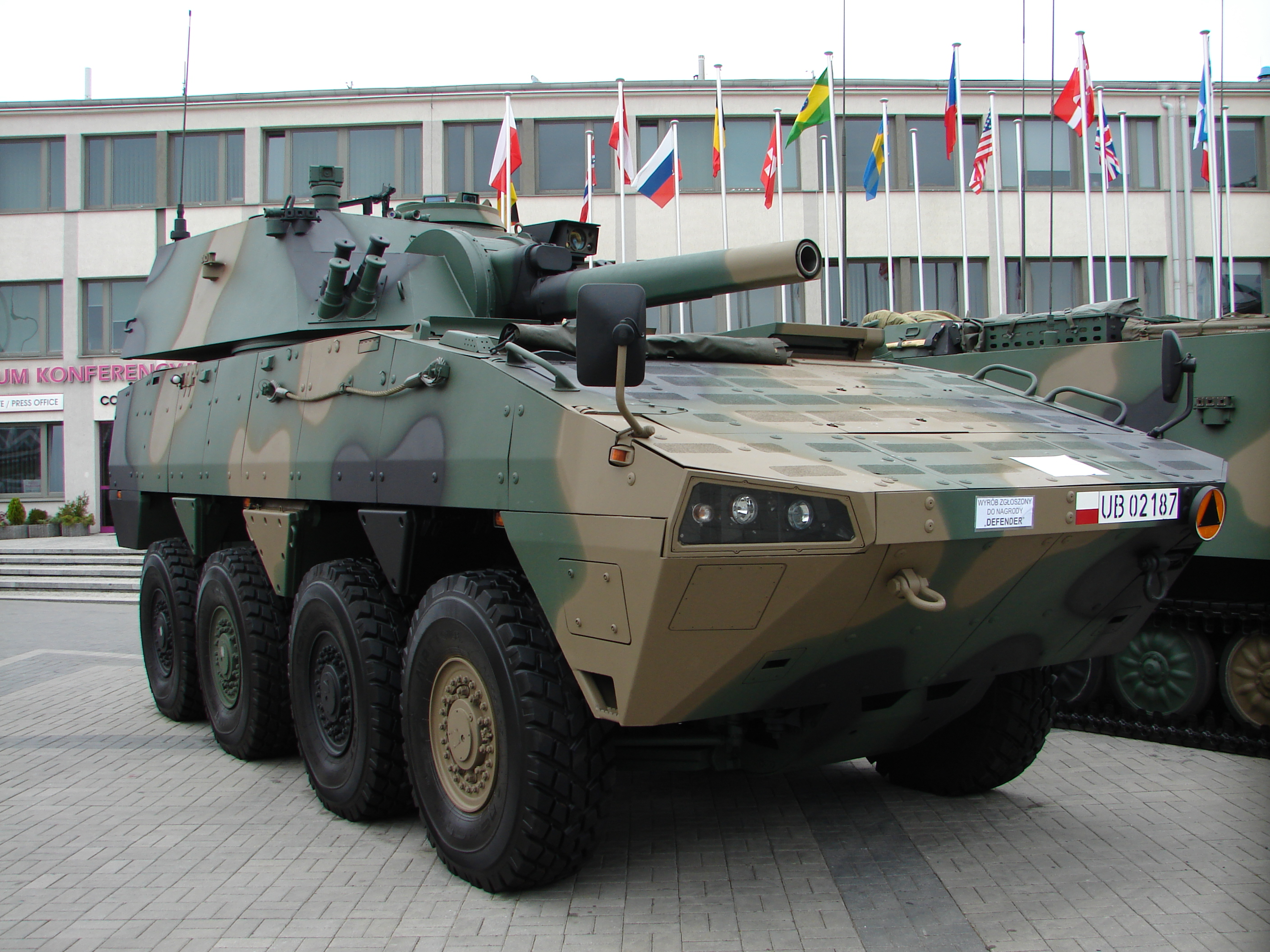
M120 Rak mortar, HSW is producer of turret part, vehicle is from WZM KTO Rosomak type

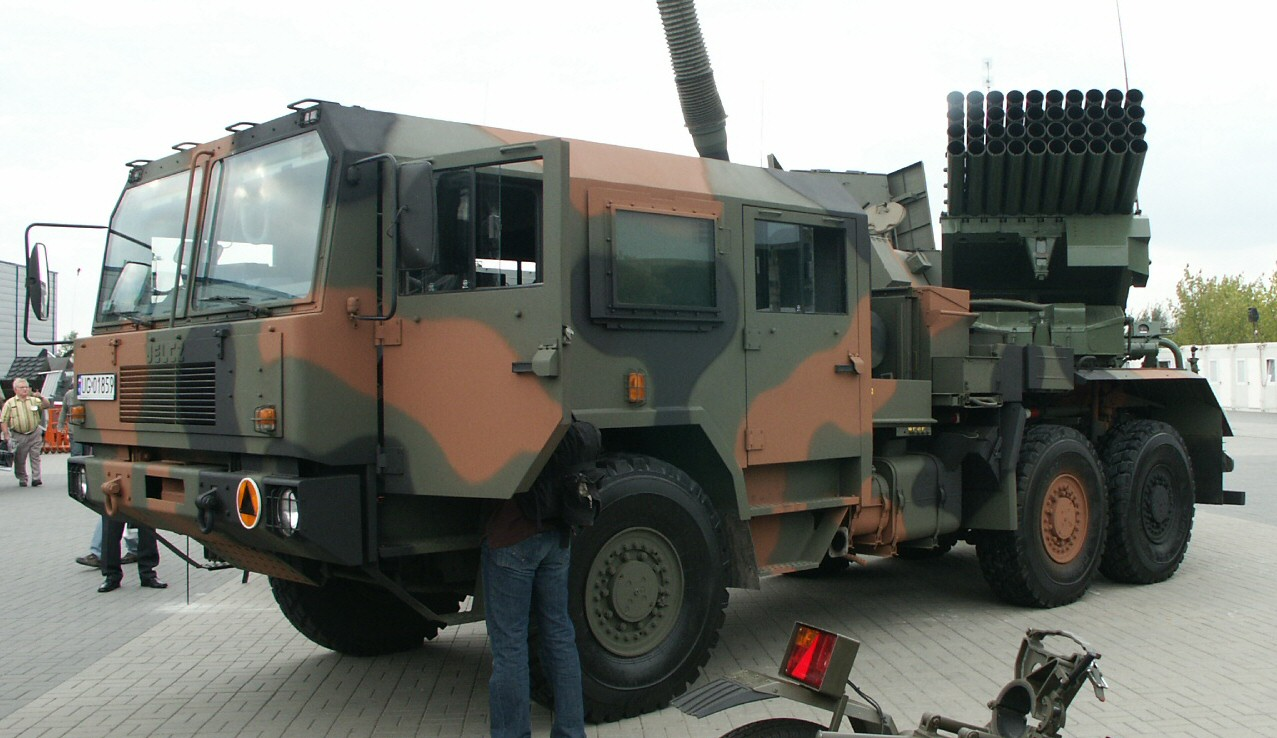
WR-40 Langusta

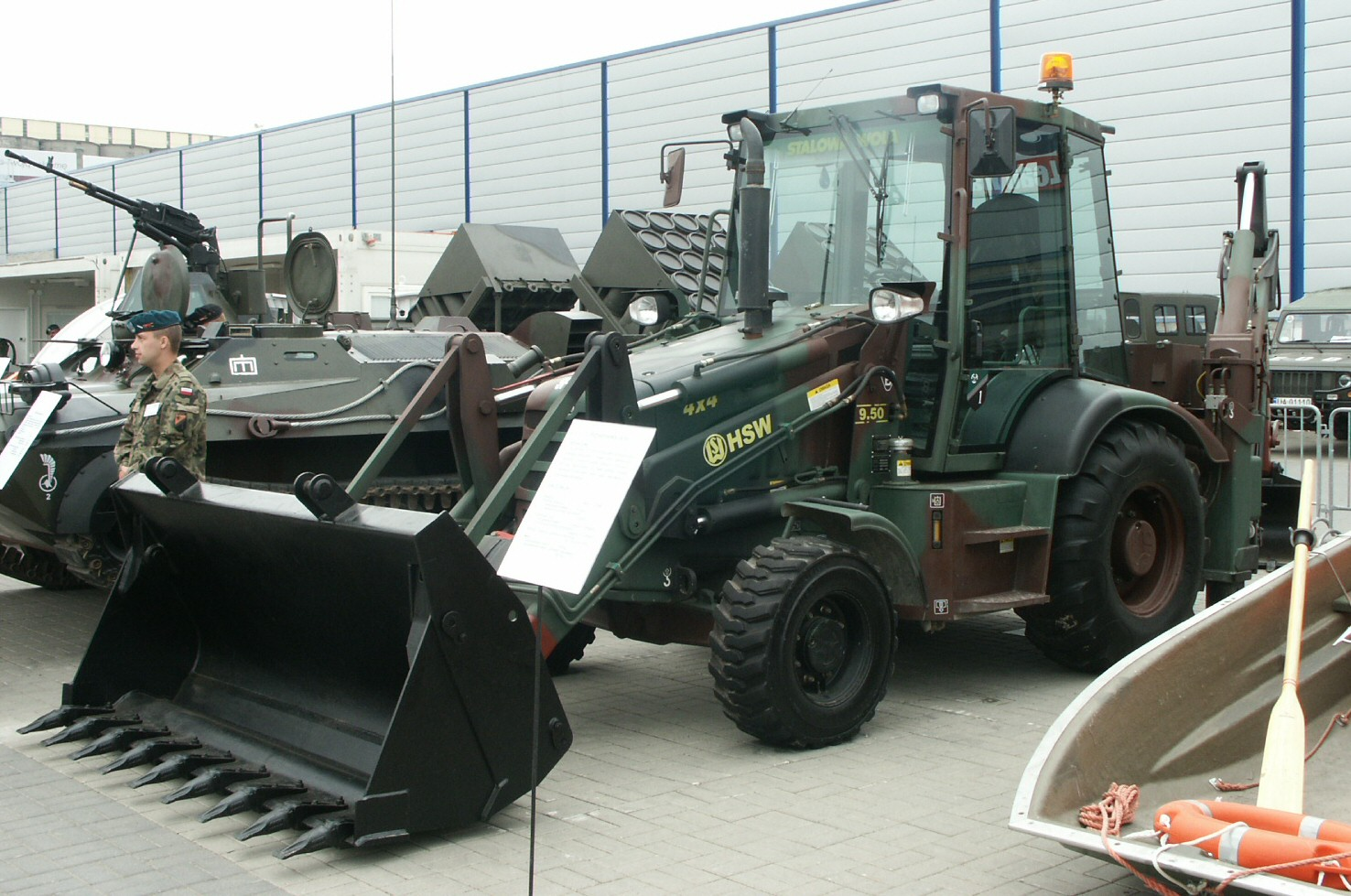
UMI 9.50

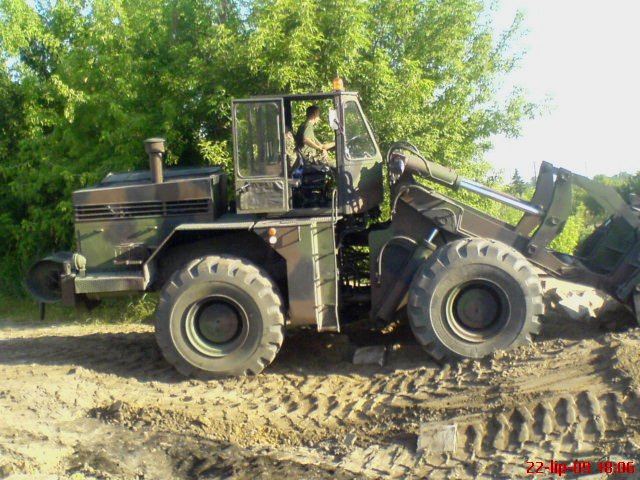
SŁ-34C

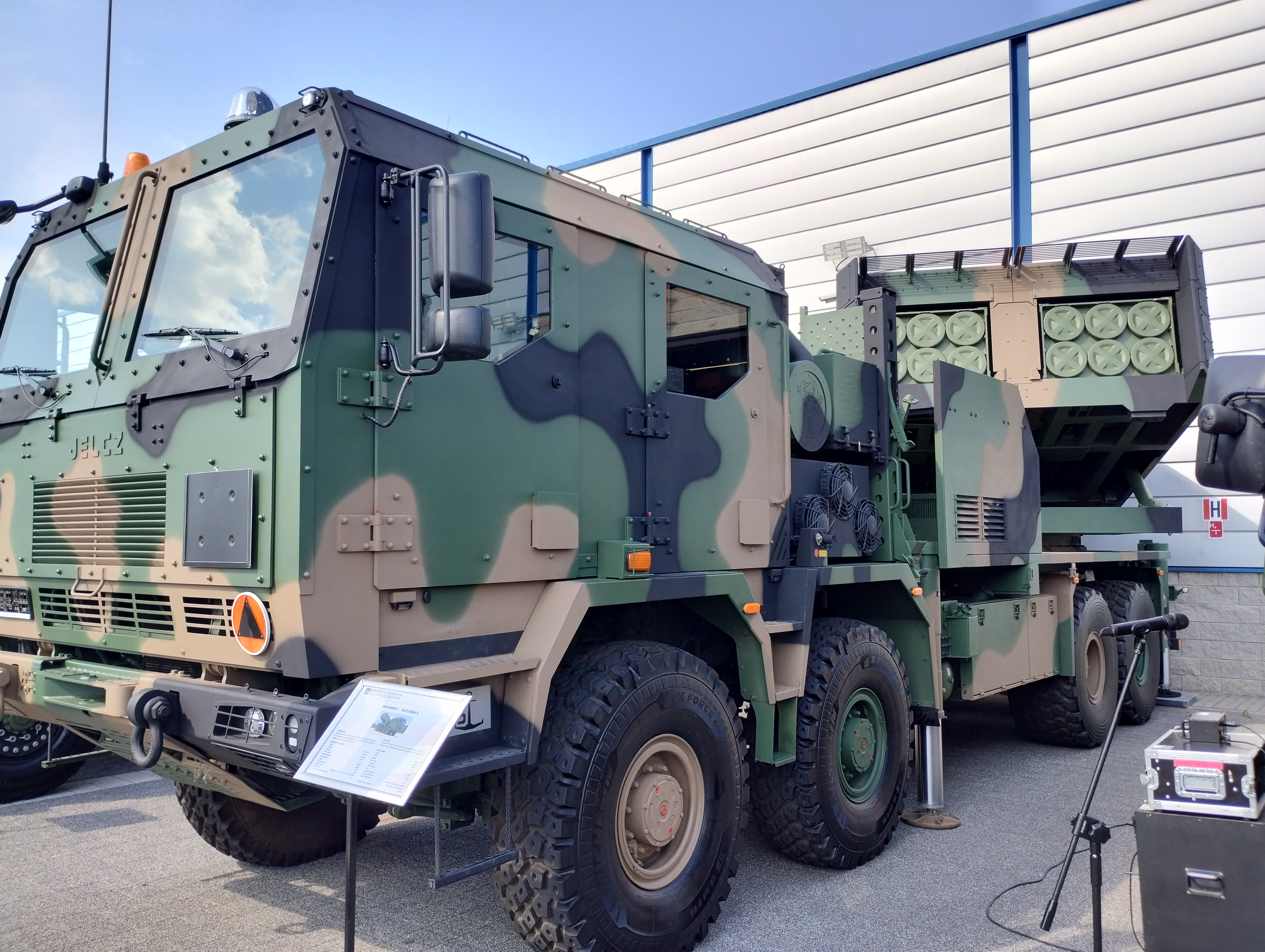
Homar-K MLRS prototype

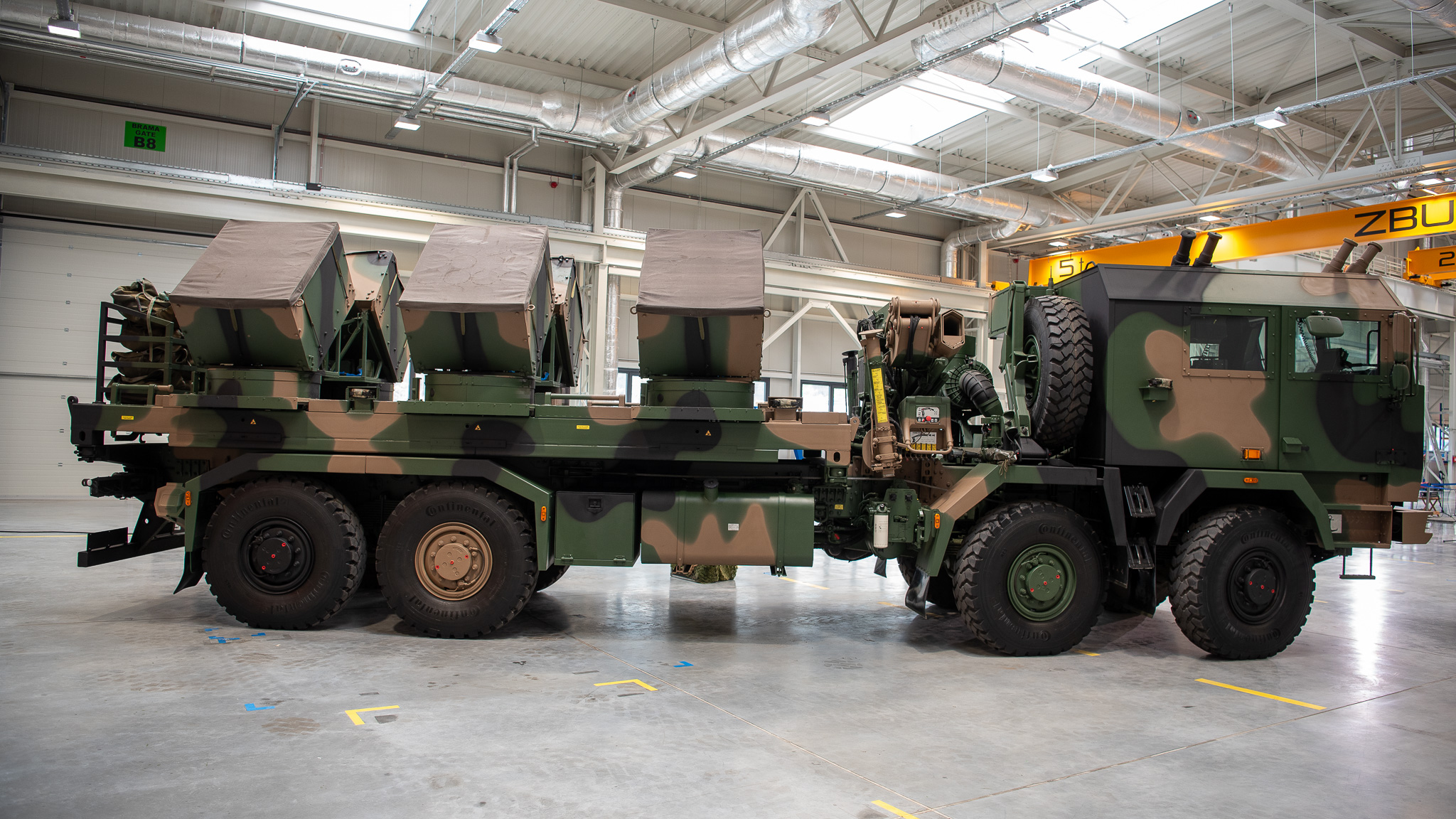
Baobab-K

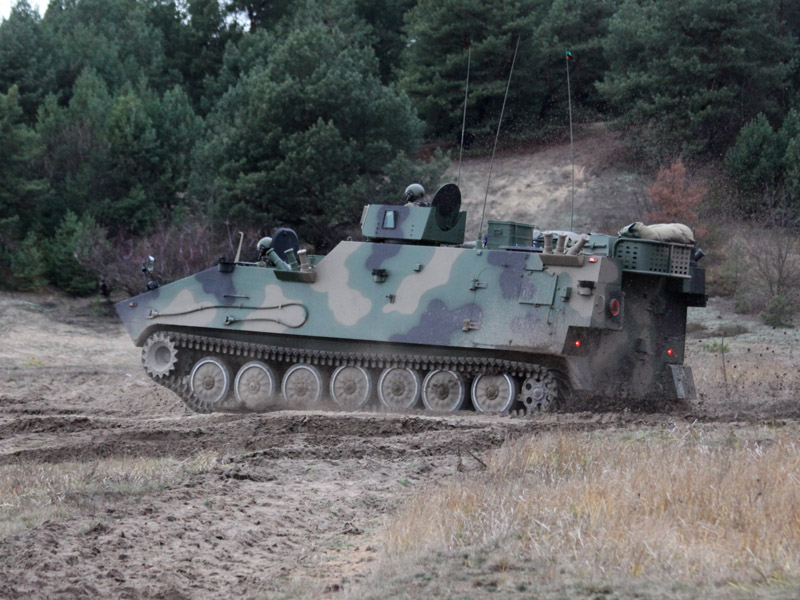
Universal Track Carrier LPG

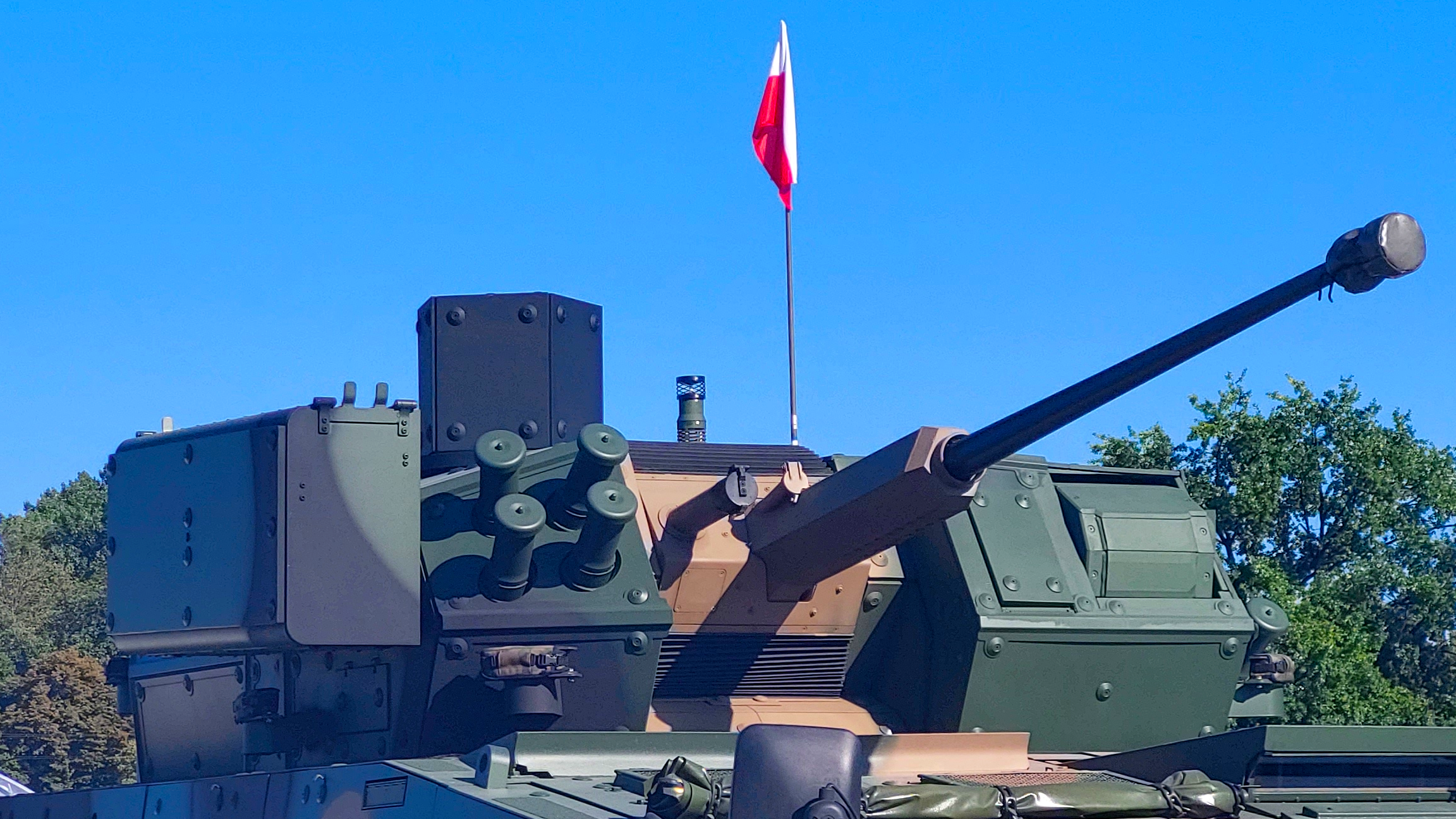
ZSSW-30

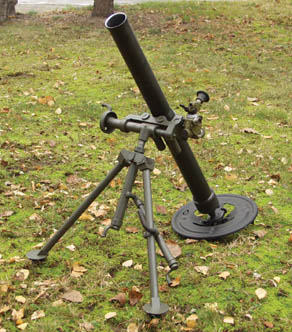
LM-60

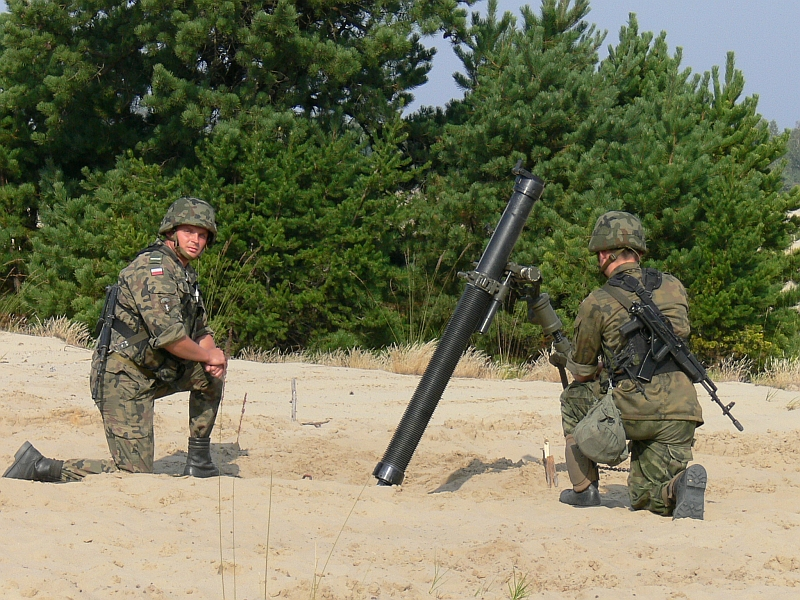
M-98 mortar

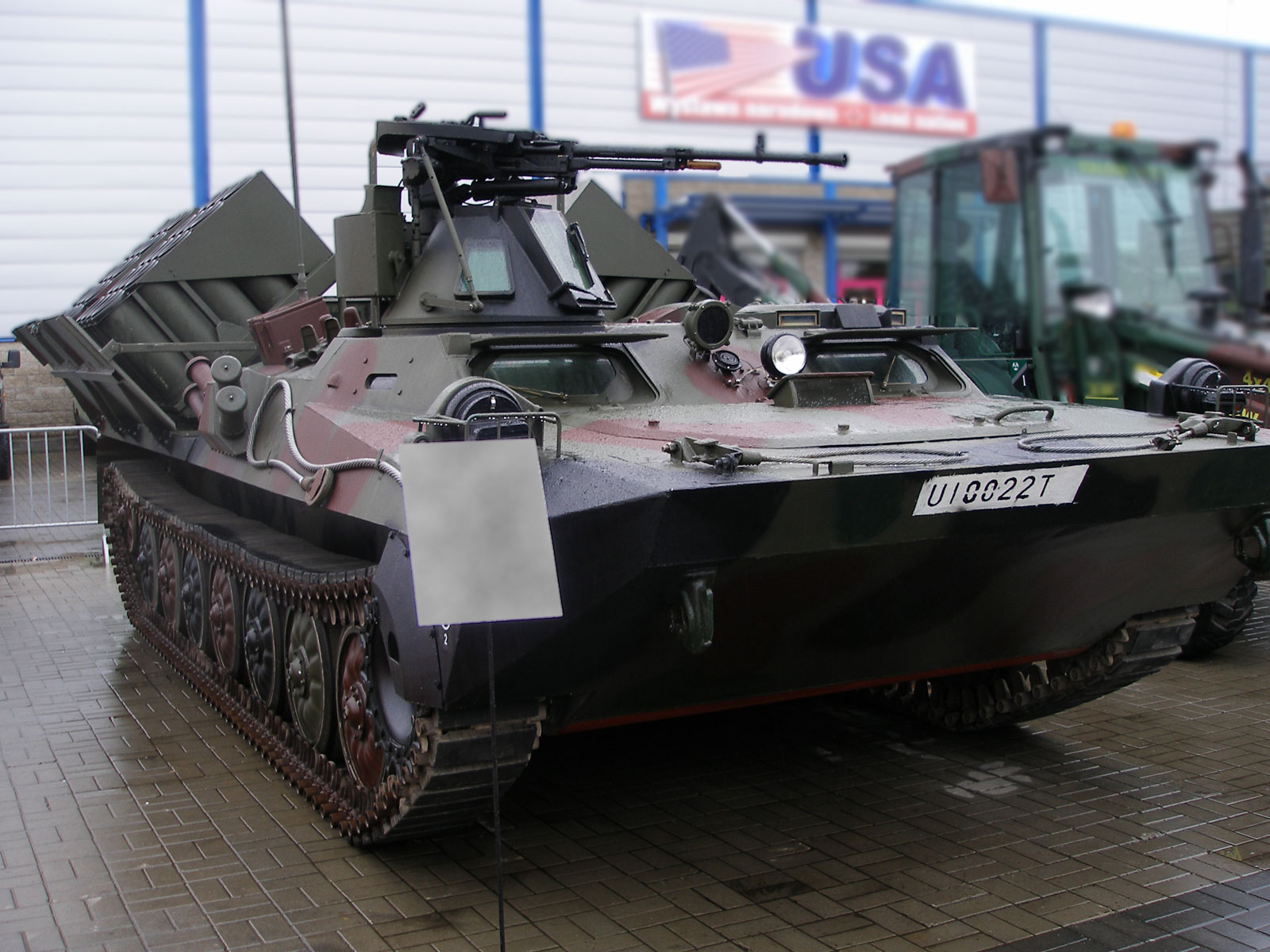
ISM Kroton
