= LRM vz. 99 ANTOS =

- Type: 60,7 mm mortar
- Place of origin: Czech Republic

Production history
- Manufacturer: VTÚVM

Specifications
- Mass: 5.3 kg 19 kg (weight of the complete set with the cargo box)
- Length: 905 mm

The LRM vz. 99 ANTOS is a Czech light mortar designed for special forces intended to be used for vehicles.

== Operators ==
- Poland: In use by Grom since 2011, also used by Military Unit Nil and other units of Special Forces and Airmobile Forces since 2016
- Czech Republic: 22 units are in service in the Czech Army as well in 601st Special Forces Group
- Jordan: 100 mortars in use since 2010

== See also ==
- LMP-2017
- LM-60

== Bibliography ==
- Sitarski, Michał. "Ultralekki moździerz z Czech". Nowa Technika Wojskowa. 9/2008. Warsaw: Magnum-X Sp. z o.o.: 88–90. ISSN 1230-1655.
