= AHS Krab =

Polish 155 mm self-propelled howitzer

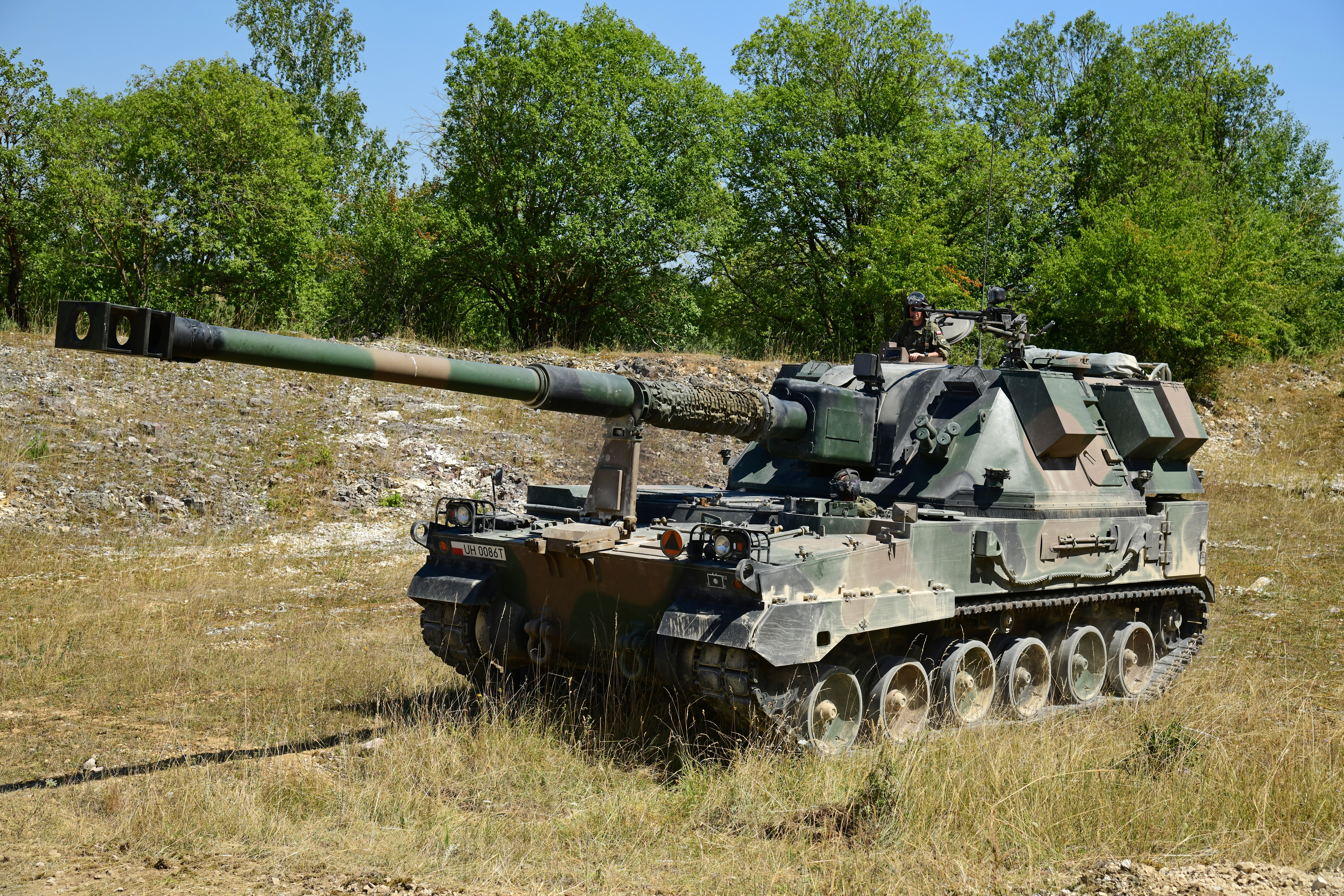
- AHS Krab, a self-propelled tracked howitzer
- Type: Self-propelled artillery
- Place of origin: Poland

Service history
- In service: 2016 – present
- Used by: Polish Land Forces; Ukrainian Ground Forces
- Wars: Russian invasion of Ukraine

Production history
- Designer: Huta Stalowa Wola; BAE Systems; Samsung Techwin
- Designed: 1997–2016
- Manufacturer: Huta Stalowa Wola
- Unit cost: US$11.45M (est)
- Produced: 2008 – present

Specifications
- Mass: 48 t (47 long tons; 53 short tons)
- Length: 12.1 m (39 ft 8 in)
- Barrel length: 8.06 m (26 ft 5 in) L/52
- Width: 3.63 m (11 ft 11 in)
- Height: 3 m (9 ft 10 in) to turret roof
- Crew: 5
- Caliber: 155 mm (6.1 in)
- Breech: Sliding block
- Elevation: +70° (1244 mils)/-3.5° (-62 mils)
- Traverse: 360° (6400 mils)
- Rate of fire: 2 rds/min sustained; 18 rds/3 mins rapid
- Maximum firing range: 30 km (19 mi) base bleed; 40 km (25 mi) Excalibur
- Armor: Max 16 mm (0.63 in) steel armour
- Main armament: 155 mm/52-calibre howitzer 40 rounds (29 turret, 11 hull)
- Secondary armament: WKM-B .50 BMG
- Engine: STX Engine/MTU Friedrichshafen MT881Ka-500 8-cylinder water-cooled diesel engine 750 kW (1,000 hp)
- Drive: Tracked
- Transmission: SNT Dynamics/Allison Transmission X1100-5A3; 4 forward, 2 reverse
- Suspension: Mottrol/Horstman Hydropneumatic Suspension Unit (HSU) travel distance: ≤ 275 mm dead weight: 40 ~ 45 kN
- Operational range: 400 km (250 mi)
- Maximum speed: 60 km/h (37 mph) on road; 30 km/h (19 mph) off road
- References: Janes

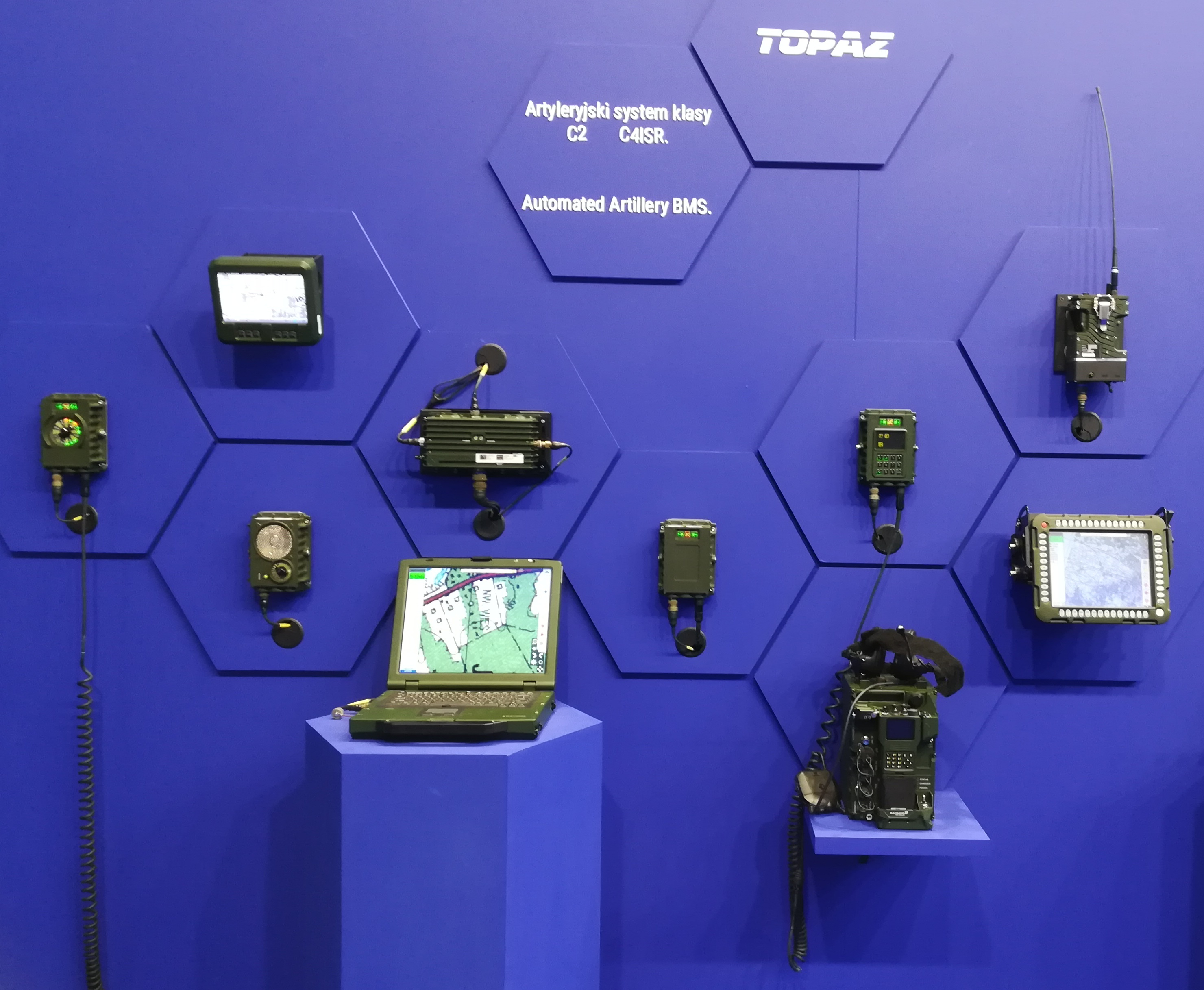
WB Electronics Topaz FCS

The AHS Krab (Polish for crab) is a 155 mm NATO-compatible self-propelled tracked gun-howitzer designed in Poland by Huta Stalowa Wola (HSW), by combining a modified South Korean K9 Thunder chassis with a British BAE Systems AS-90M Braveheart turret with a 52-calibre gun produced by HSW and the Polish WB Electronics' Topaz artillery fire control system. "AHS" is not a part of the name, but the Polish abbreviation of armatohaubica samobieżna – gun-howitzer, self-propelled.

The 2011 prototype version used Nexter Systems barrels and UPG-NG chassis from domestic company Bumar-Łabędy.

For the production variant, since 2016, Poland decided to base the self-propelled howitzer on a modified K9 chassis with an STX Engine-MTU Friedrichshafen engine and, since 2019, uses barrels made domestically by HSW (earlier, the barrels were delivered by Rheinmetall).

== History ==
The cannon was developed within the "Regina" research framework. The program's goal was to create a 155 mm (6.1 in) calibre long-range artillery piece for the Polish Army that would serve as a division-level asset. It was decided, that instead of buying a licence for a complete vehicle, only a licence for a modern L/52 gun and turret would be bought, and they would be mounted on domestically developed chassis.

In 1997 a competition for an artillery component, a complete turret with a gun, was announced. The British AS-90M won the competition, the other contestant was the PzH-2000. In 1999 its technology was transferred to Huta Stalowa Wola factory. The UPG-NG chassis was developed in Poland by OBRUM in Gliwice, from an SPG-1M chassis, itself developed from a Soviet MT-S tractor, using parts combined with the PT-91 Twardy tank. The first prototype was completed in 2001, and the second the following year.

The first two prototypes of the howitzer are fitted with turret systems supplied by BAE Systems. It was planned to complete the first squadron in 2008, but the program was delayed due to financial reasons, and not until 2008 did the Polish Army order the introductory batch of the squadron module, completed in 2012. It covers eight guns (six new-built and two upgraded prototype vehicles), command vehicles (on a much modernized MTLB chassis), as well as ammunition and repair vehicles for the ordnance and electronics.

In the introductory and series products, Nexter guns replaced the original British pieces. The trial firing of another gun supplied by the manufacturer continued every month through the end of the year. The third gun was tested on 10 August under the supervision of representatives of the Armament Inspectorate and the Head Office of the Missile and Artillery Force of the Air Forces, at the Dynamic Trial Center of the WITU, the Military Technical Institute of Armament, in Stalowa Wola.

The first firing of the third complete Krab, which also received new elements of onboard electronics developed by WB Electronics, occurred in July 2011. The concentration of fire was among the requirements tested. As of 2012, two prototypes and eight initial units, two artillery batteries each with four guns, had been built by Huta Stalowa Wola. In 2012–2013 eight new examples were used for tests conducted by the Polish Army as a part of a "Regina" battery command module.

In December 2014, the Polish Ministry of Defence announced a deal worth US$320M with Korean firm Samsung Techwin (now Hanwha Techwin) to purchase 120 K9 Thunder chassis, with the first 24 to be delivered in 2017 and 96 to be built under licence in Poland in 2018–2022. Poland also evaluated the Turkish-built T-155 Firtina chassis of the same origin. The original Polish OBRUM's (Note: OBRUM stands for Ośrodek Badawczo-Rozwojowy Urządzeń Mechanicznych (Polish: "Research and Development Centre for Mechanical Appliances")) The UPG-NG chassis built by BUMAR, which had been used in the eight initial production howitzers and which was equipped with an S-12U engine and other elements (like road wheels) from the PT-91 Twardy, was abandoned due to structural cracks and ceased production of S-12U engines.

The first K9 chassis was shipped to Poland for testing and integration in June 2015. The prototype was rolled out in August 2015. It went through type acceptance testing in October 2015. The test ended successfully in April 2016, allowing series production. In April 2016, the Ministry of National Defence and the manufacturer concluded the research and development phase. In April 2016, during the Polish prime minister's visit to Stalowa Wola, the first two serial examples were handed over to the Polish Army.

They joined eight initial production examples at the Artillery Training Center in Toruń, and were used to develop operational standards for combat units. During the handover ceremony in November 2016, nine Krabs were accepted in the presence of the Polish Minister of National Defence, while seven more were in the acceptance testing phase. Eight original turrets on UPG chassis are scheduled to be upgraded to the K9 chassis after the first batch of 16 guns is delivered by the end of 2016. The deal for the next 96 units was signed in December 2016, raising total order to 120 Krabs for five regiments. Poland originally planned to import 36 chassis from South Korea and produce 84 chassis in Poland to deliver 120 vehicles by 2022. However, the schedule was extended to 2024 as Poland increased its domestic produced chassis from 84 to 96.

Each of the planned five regiments of Krabs will be equipped with 24 howitzers. The first unit to receive 24 Krabs by 2017 will be 11th Masurian Artillery Regiment in Węgorzewo. The development program of advanced, smart 155 mm ammunition was expected to conclude in 2017.

In late May 2022, the Polish government donated 18 Krabs to Ukraine to help the Ukrainian military defend the nation against the Russian invasion of Ukraine. The two governments signed a contract under which Poland will sell Ukraine an additional 60 Krabs, in a deal worth 3 billion złotys (US$700 million). With the deal, Ukraine became the first export customer for Polish Krabs. The agreement was the largest defence contract that Poland had made in the previous 20 years. In October 2022, Ukraine's Ministry of Defence Oleksii Reznikov revealed, that Poland had already donated three battalions of Krabs (i.e. 54 pieces with support vehicles), and another three were ordered.

=== Heavy IFV ===
In August 2023, the consortium of Polish Armaments Group (PGZ) and HSW signed a framework contract with Poland's MND Armament Agency to deliver 700 Ciężki Bojowy Wóz Piechoty (CBWP, Heavy Infantry Combat Vehicles) beginning in 2025. The vehicle's chassis will be made using elements of the Krab SPH fitted with the ZSSW-30 remote turret system to carry three crew and eight troops and engage various targets in direct contact while having a high level of ballistic and anti-mine protection.

== Orders ==
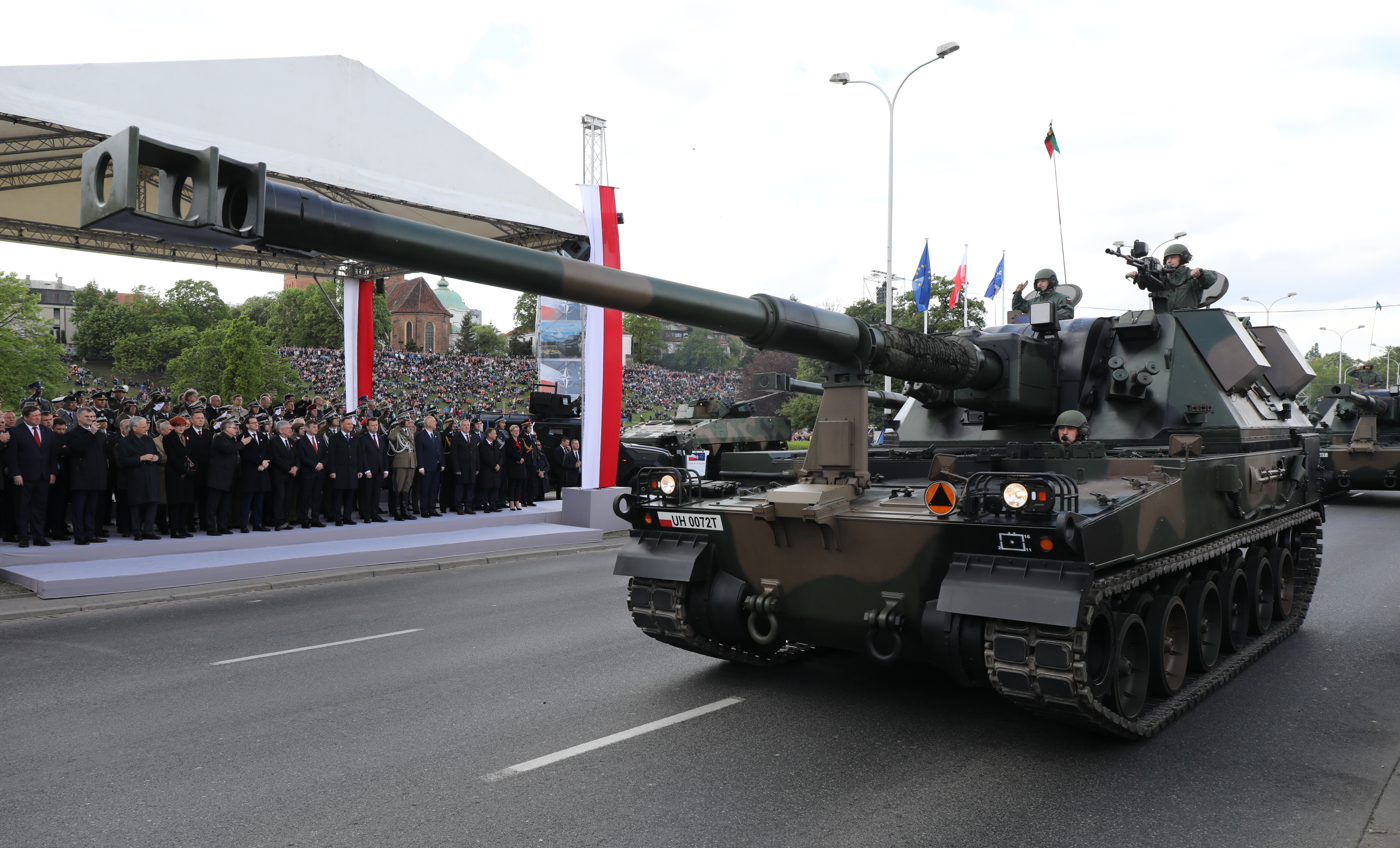
AHS Krab howitzer during the Armed Forces Day parade in Warsaw

(Poland) Polish Land Forces (248 to be delivered + framework agreement for 56)
60 vehicles in service as of December 2025.
- 1st order: 24 with chassis delivered from South Korea. Delivery completed in 2016.
- 2nd order: 96 in 2016 with delivery scheduled by 2024. 56 were delivered by 2022, but the schedule for the remaining 40 vehicles was postponed from 2022–2024 to 2025–2027 to prioritize Ukrainian order.

- 2 trainers were added as part of the 2016 contract adjustment on 16 December 2020. Delivered in December 2025.
- 54 vehicles were donated to Ukraine in 2022.

- 3rd order: 48 for a value of PLN 3.8 billion zlotys (USD $797 million) on September 2022. Delivery was postponed to 2025–2027 due to Ukrainian order.
- 4th order: 96 Krabs with command vehicles, command and staff vehicles, ammunition vehicles, and repair workshops worth PLN 9 billion was signed on 23 December 2024 as a part of the framework agreement for 152 Krab on 8 December 2023.. The delivery is scheduled by the end of 2029.

- 5th order: Another 96 Krabs with command and logistics support vehicle worth roughly PLN 9 billion (1.9 billion EUR). Signed on May 30, 2026. Delivery is scheduled to be completed by 2030.

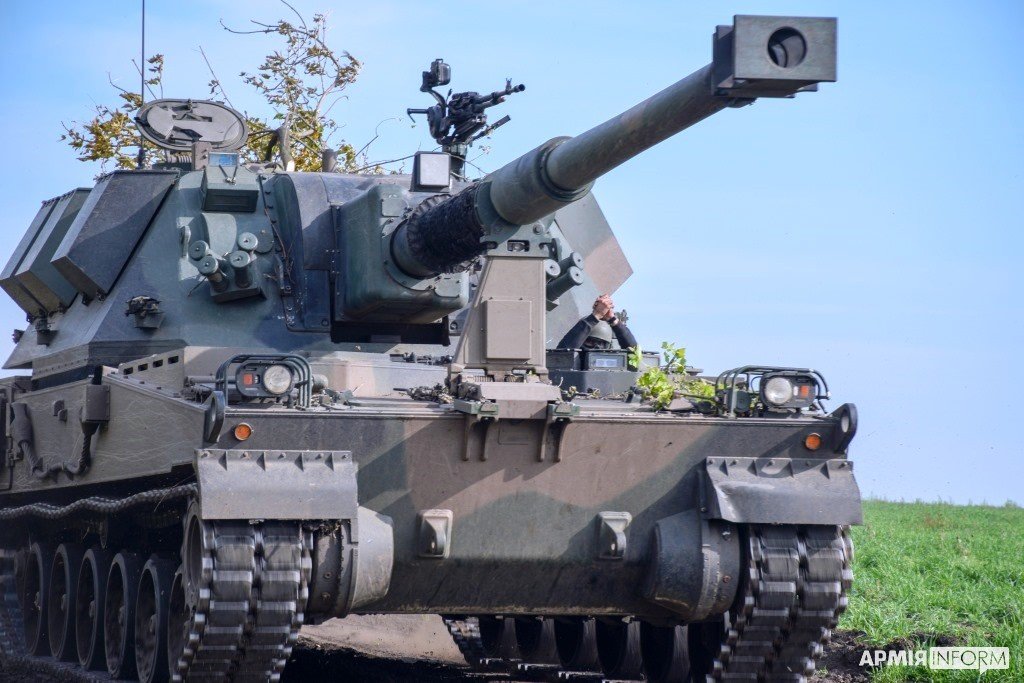
AHS Krab of a Ukrainian artillery brigade during Russian invasion of Ukraine

(Ukraine) Ukrainian Ground Forces
Acquisition of 108 guns was completed in December 2024. At least 38 were destroyed, and at least 7 were damaged.
- Poland publicly announced a donation of 18 Krabs; however, in October 2022, Ukrainian Minister of Defence Oleksii Reznikov confirmed 54 Krabs were donated.
- 54 ordered in June 2022 for $700 million.

== Operational history ==
=== Russian invasion of Ukraine ===
Ukraine reported that it used the weapon during fighting near Sievierodonetsk.

The AHS Krab was used during the 2022 Ukrainian eastern counteroffensive in Kharkiv Oblast.

In Autumn 2022 it was revealed that Ukraine used the Krab with Excalibur precision ammunition, obtaining a range over 50 km.

==== Losses ====
The OSINT analysis website Oryx has documented confirmed Ukrainian Krab losses at 38 units destroyed and 7 damaged.
