= Baobab-K =

Polish truck-mounted mine-laying system

Minelayer Baobab-K
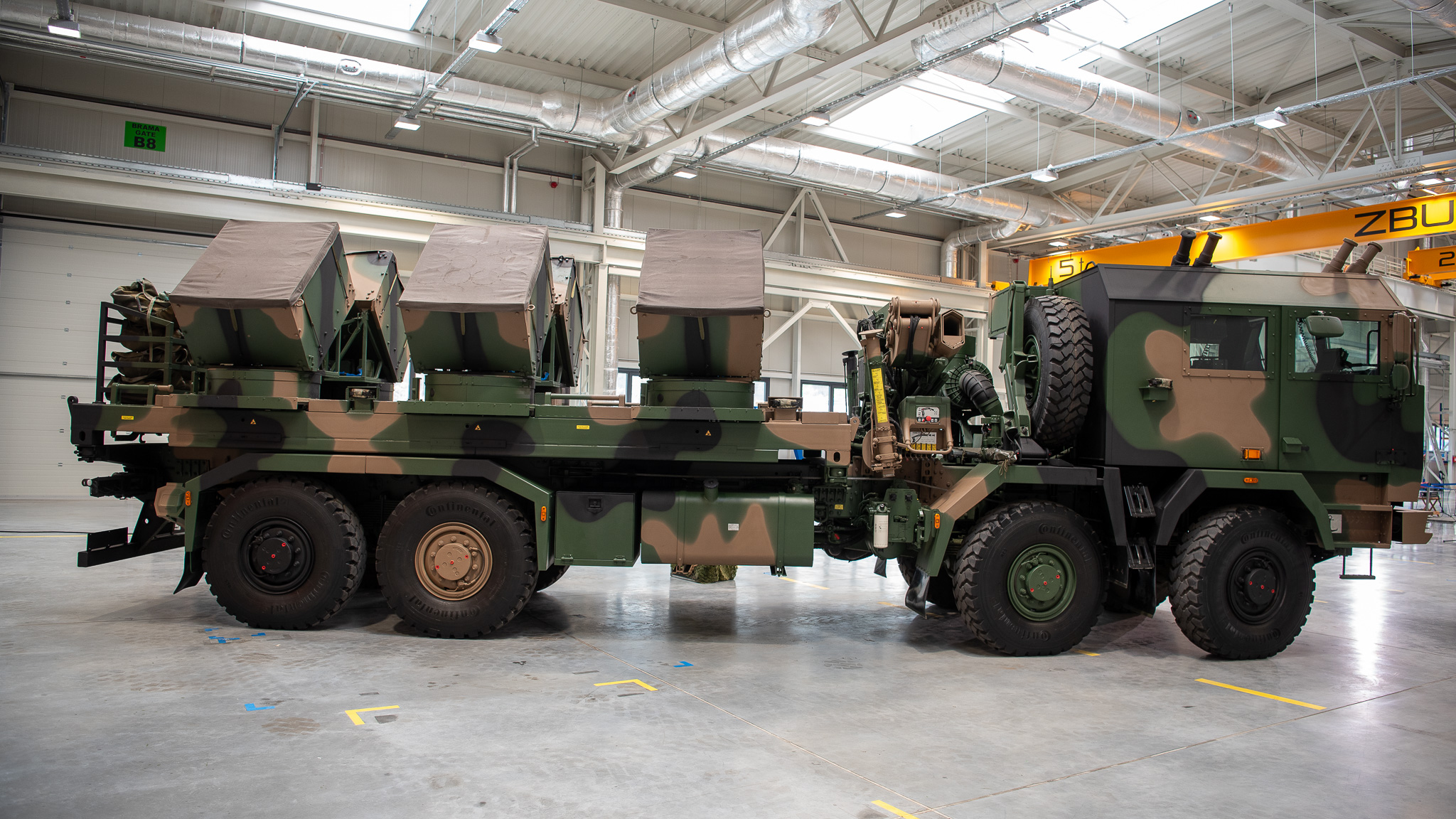
- Baobab-K
- Type: Minelayer
- Place of origin: Poland

Production history
- Manufacturer: HSW

The Baobab-K is a Polish automated mine-laying system mounted on the Jelcz 8×8 truck chassis.

== History ==
The Baobab-K's research and development phase began in 2017.

On 14 June 2023, Polish deputy prime minister Mariusz Błaszczak granted approval for delivery contracts of the Baobab-K mine-laying vehicles and their corresponding mines by Huta Stalowa Wola. During the approval process, it was disclosed that one of the contracts entails the supply of 24 Baobab-K mine-laying vehicles for a total value of PLN 510 million. The delivery of the vehicles is scheduled to take place between 2026 and 2028.

Additionally, the contracts involve the purchase of mines and cassettes amounting to PLN 566 million.

== Specifications ==
The vehicle operates with a two-person crew and has a maximum capacity of up to 600 mines. It is capable of traversing mine-laying operations at speeds ranging from 5 to 25 km/h, covering an area of approximately 1,800 meters in length and 180 meters in width.
