= SŁ-34C =

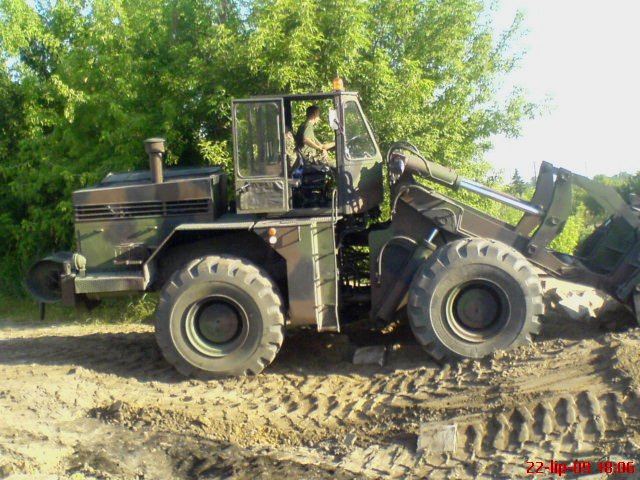
- SŁ-34C
- Type: Bulldozer-loader
- Place of origin: Poland

Service history
- Used by: Polish Land Forces

Production history
- Designer: Huta Stalowa Wola
- No. built: ~28
- Variants: SŁ-34C,SŁ-34B

Specifications
- Mass: 22 830 kg
- Length: 9 595 mm
- Width: 2 982 mm
- Height: 3 607 mm

SŁ-34C is a bulldozer-loader (spycharko ładowarka) produced by Huta Stalowa Wola and used by Polish army for excavation, leveling, pushing and dumping earth, loading and transporting mined material, and other engineering tasks.

== Construction ==
SŁ-34C is the latest bulldozer-loader version. On the basis of the updated ρ34 loader, the machine was built, adding a winch and other equipment.

The vehicle is powered by Cummins diesel engine with an output of 158 kW (212 HP),

instead of the WSK Mielec SW680/59/8 engine. Specialized equipment for road, bridge, and river obstacle reconnaissance was installed, along with a new, compact cabin equipped with rifle mounts and a filter-ventilation mechanism. Additionally, a water heating device was fitted to heat the cabin and the engine.

== Standard equipment ==
- bucket
- winch
- fork attachment with the possibility of extending the forks with adjustable spacing, adapted for loading and unloading elements placed on euro pallets or in containers
- Rockinger RO 561 E hitch and pneumatic and electrical connections

== Optional equipment ==
- two-piece spoon,
- two-part spoon,
- high tip bucket,
- stone spoon,
- light material bucket (5.7 m^{3}),
- stone spoon with teeth,
- hydraulic grab,
- forklift attachment for quick coupler,
- forks up to 5.5 t

== Specifications ==
- Weight of the set with the multi-purpose bucket installed - 22,830 kg
- Height to the cabin roof – 3607 mm
- Weight of the set with forklift attachment – 22,310 kg
- Total length of the set with the bucket on the ground – 8,380 mm
- Total length of the set with forks on the ground – 9,595 mm
- Nominal length of the forks used – 1,600 mm
- Fork extension possible – up to 2,300 mm
- Set width – 2,982 mm
- Height to the roof of the operator's/driver's cabin - 3,607 mm
- Wheelbase – 3,145 mm
- Total bucket capacity – 3.4 m^{3}
- Road clearance – 450 mm
- Right/left turning angle – 35 degrees
- Maximum bucket load capacity – up to 7,600 kg
- Maximum fork load capacity – up to 8,000 kg
- Maximum machine speed – up to 39 km/h
- Engine power – 158 kW
- Maximum unloading height at a 45 degree tipping angle – 2950 mm.
- Lifting height 3800 – 4000 mm
- Maximum steering angle – 35 degrees

== Deliveries ==
- 17: 2019 (S-34C variant)
- 3: June 2021 (S-34C variant)
- 8: November 2021 (S-34C variant)

== Gallery ==
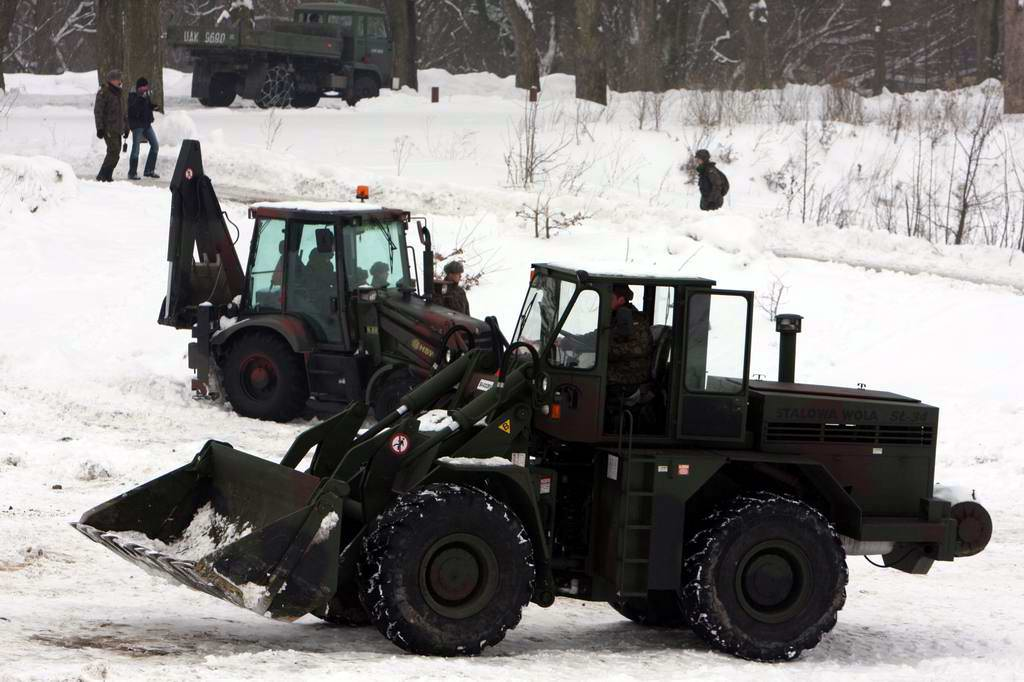

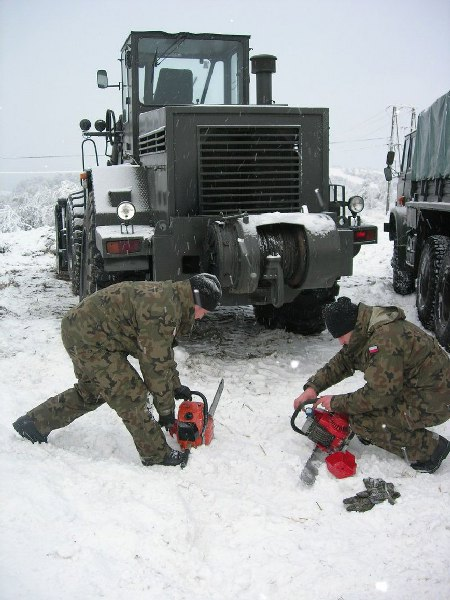

== See also ==
Bożena 4 (anti-mine minesweeper)
