= LM-60 =

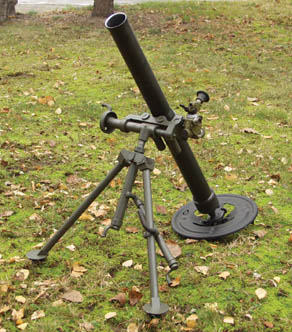
- Type: Mortar
- Place of origin: Poland

Service history
- In service: 2000-present
- Used by: Poland; Lithuania; Ukraine

Production history
- Designer: Military Institute of Armament Technology
- Manufacturer: ZM „Tarnów”
- Produced: 2000-2017
- No. built: 500+
- Variants: LM-60D; LM-60K

Specifications
- Caliber: 60mm
- Rate of fire: 25 shots per minute
- Effective firing range: 2329m

The LM-60 is a 60mm mortar designed in the 1990s in Tarnów, adopted by the Polish Armed Forces. Produced in two versions: the basic LM-60D and the lighter LM-60K ("commando").

== History ==
Work on light mortars began in Poland in the early 1990s and was carried out in parallel by Huta Stalowa Wola together with the Military Institute of Armament Technology and the Research and Development Centre for Mechanical Equipment (OBR SM) in Tarnów. Work began at OBR SM in 1991, in a team led by Dr. Eng. Tadeusz Świętek. In addition to the basic version of the LM-60D (from "long-range") on a bipod, for mechanized, motorized and mountain infantry units, a "commando" version of the LM-60K was developed for special and airborne units.

The ammunition was designed at that time by WITU, which led to the determination of the mortar caliber at 60 mm. Qualification tests were conducted in 1994–1996. The mortar from Tarnów was qualified for serial production and in 1998 the army ordered an implementation batch of 6 LM-60D and 3 LM-60K. On August 2, 2000, by order of the Chief of General Staff, the LM-60D/K mortar was accepted into the equipment of the Polish Armed Forces.

== Variants ==
=== LM-60D ===
LM-60D mortars are used at the platoon and company levels, replacing the old 82 mm mortars. This variant has entered the armament of mortar teams in motorized platoons on Rosomak wheeled infantry fighting vehicles. They are carried there by one Rosomak from the platoon, and are operated by two soldiers. They have also replaced 82 mm mortars in the mixed artillery battery of the 25th Air Cavalry Brigade (9 mortars). Deliveries of LM-60D mortars continued until 2017. Over 500 pieces have been delivered so far.

In 2017, LM-60D mortars were replaced in airmobile units by the light Czech Antos mortars, which better meet the requirements. For export purposes, Zakłady Mechaniczne "Tarnów", which took over OBR SM in Tarnów, developed the LM-61D mortar with a 60.7 mm caliber and 1,000 mm long barrel in 2014, and in 2017 the LM-61M mortar of this caliber with a modular design.

=== LM-60K „Commando” ===
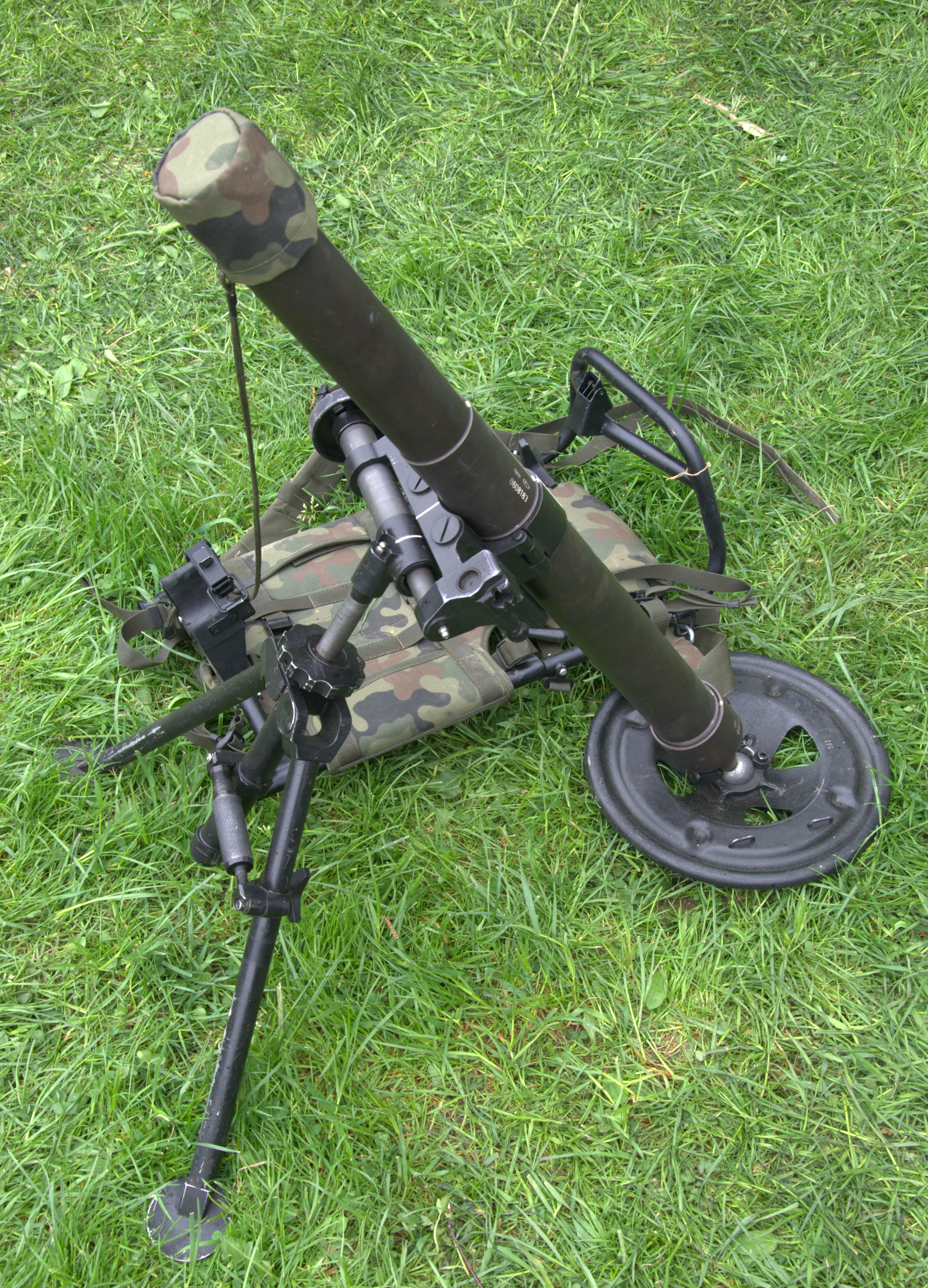
LM-60D

The LM-60K ("commando") version was designed for special forces and as additional equipment for vehicles. It was included in the equipment of reconnaissance and special units of the Polish Armed Forces (including GROM) and as additional equipment in BRDM-2 M96/M97 "Żbik" reconnaissance vehicles.

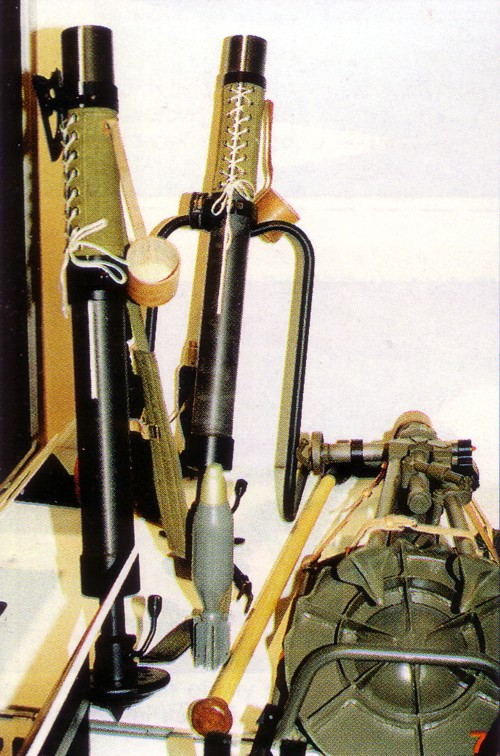
LM-60K

The LM-60K mortar has a steel barrel with a lock, rigidly attached to the base plate. This solution allows for shooting with elevation angles from 5 to 85°. Aiming is carried out "by hand" - the direction is set by aligning the barrel axis with the target, while elevation is operated using a gravity sight - this allows for shooting on flat trajectories. The LM-60K mortar can be carried and operated by a single soldier.

In addition to the standard LM-60K version, a version with an aluminum barrel (reinforced with a carbon fiber and Kevlar braid) was also created. Its designation is LM-60KC.

In 2000, two LM-60Ks were given to Lithuania.

In Polish service, the LM-60K mortar was later replaced by the Czech 60 mm mortar LRM vz. 99 ANTOS.

== Specifications ==
=== LM-60D ===
- Calibre - 60mm
- Range - 70 - 2330m
- Rate of fire - 25 rds./min
- Weight - 19,3 kg
- Number of operators - 3 or 2
- Work mode - single shot

=== LM-60K ===
- Calibre - 60mm
- Range - 70 - 1300m
- Rate of fire - 25 rds./min
- Weight - 7,8 kg
- Number of operators - 2 or 1
- Work mode - single shot

== Users ==
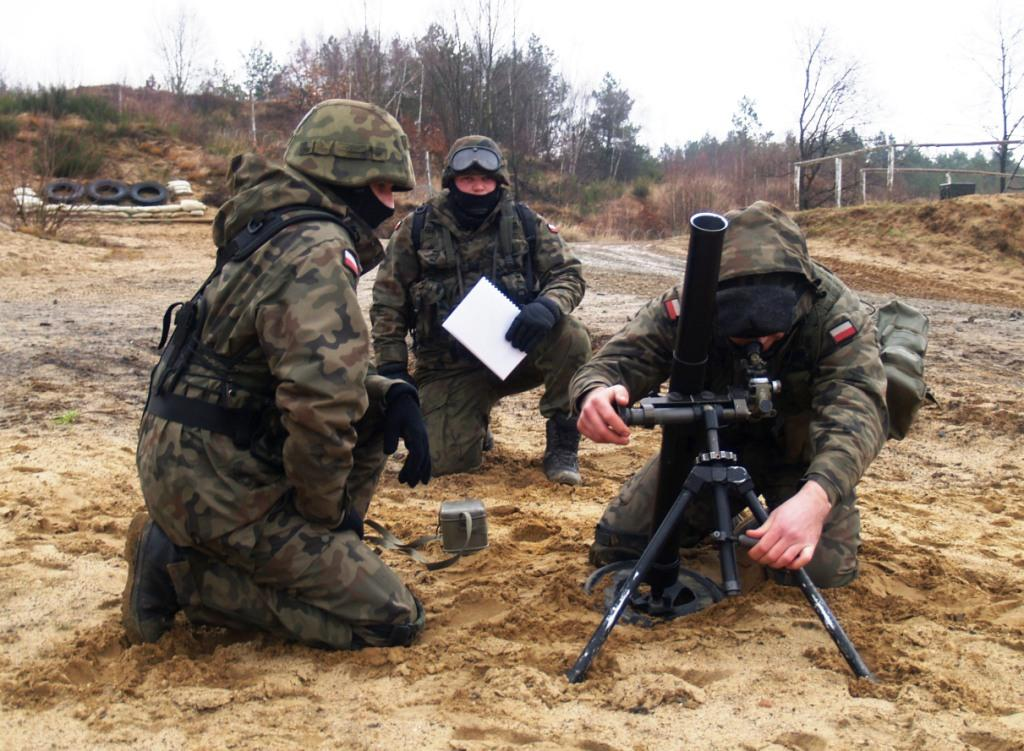
Polish soldiers with an LM-60D mortar, 2008

- Poland
- Lithuania
- Ukraine

== See also ==
- LMP-2017
