= Bożena 4 (anti-mine minesweeper) =

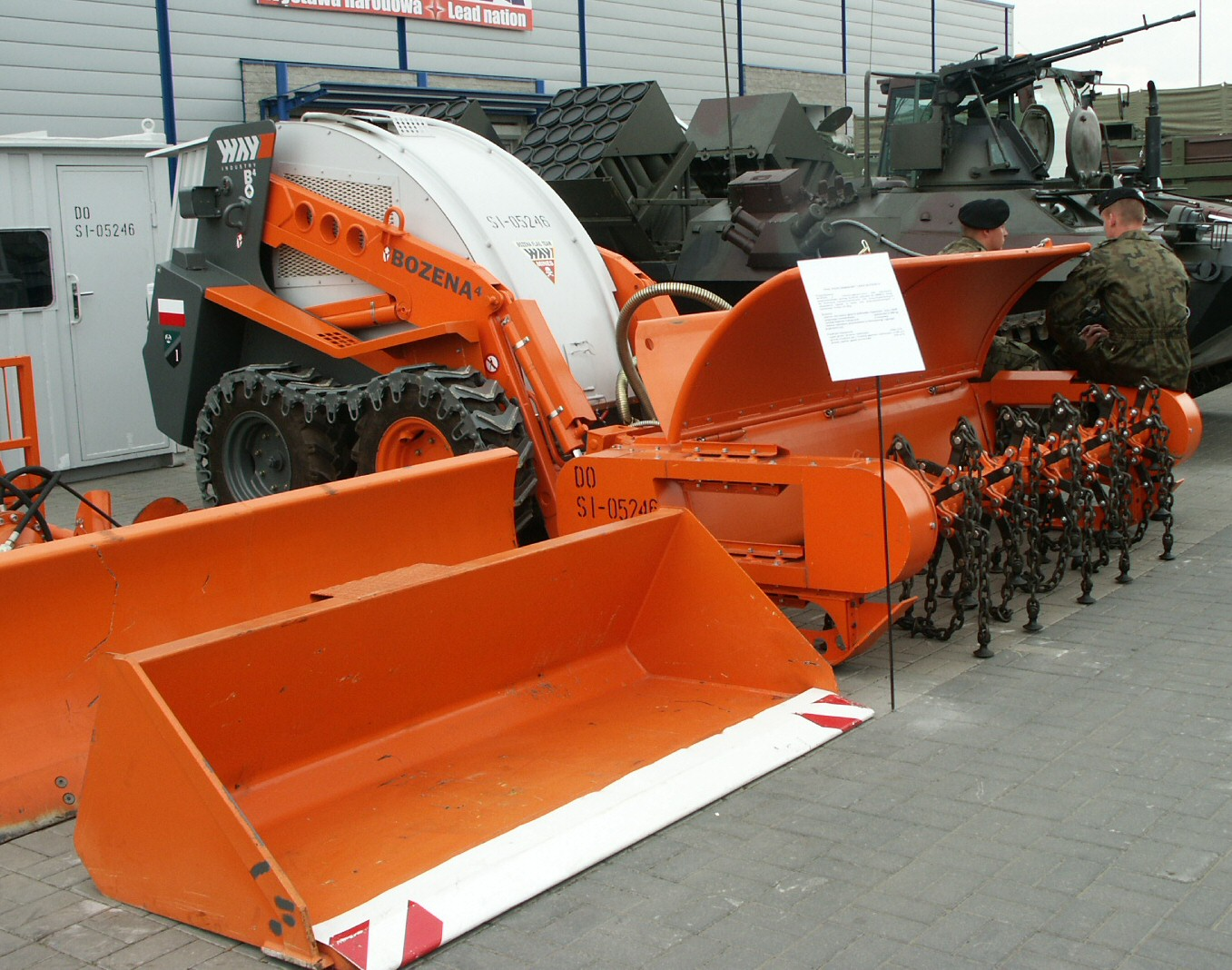
- Bożena 4 at International Defence Industry Exhibition 2007
- Type: Mine clearing remote controlled vehicle
- Place of origin: Slovakia / Poland

Service history
- Used by: Ground Forces of the Slovak Republic; Polish Land Forces

== Design ==
Designed for tasks related to surface clearing of anti-personnel and anti-tank mines. It can be used for other work where direct presence of a person is in danger. Drills, loader buckets, pallet forks, handle-equipped forks, and excavator buckets can all be connected. From an armored cabin, control is done by radio.

== Composition ==
- Remotely controlled by main drive unit B4 – L 1203 RC – serves as a carrier for the minesweeping unit.
- Transport trailer SPP6 – serves to transport the main drive unit B4 – L 1203 RC.
- The minesweeping unit (working tool) – is a device that activates or mechanically destroys mines using rotating beaters mounted on chains.
- Beater – serves for surface mine cleaning.
- Monitoring cabin for the operator – is an air-conditioned workplace for the operator, from which he controls the mine-clearing device.

The main drive unit B4 – L 1203 RC can work with the following working tools:

- Shovel without gear
- Shovel with rack
- Shovel for light materials
- Combined bucket (DROTT)
- Pallet forks
- Fork end with handle
- Backhoe bucket
- Husky 10 winch or RAMSEY RPH 10 hydraulic winch.

== Specifications ==
- Engine: DEUTZ BF 4L613
- Engine power: 78 kW
- Speed: 10 km/h
- Weight: 5800 kg
- Demining belt width: 2000 mm
- Demining depth: up to 250 mm
- Efficiency: up to 2500 m²/h
- Control range: up to 2000 m

== Operators ==
Slovakia
Bożena minesweeps are currently in use by the Slovak army.

Poland
In 2003, Polish Army acquired two sets for the needs of the Polish contingent in Iraq.

== Bibliography ==
- Information leaflet displayed next to the equipment during the 5th Anniversary celebrations.
- Operational Documentation of the Light Mine Countermeasure Vessel BOŻENA 4 – WAY INDUSTRY, a. s. KRUPINA, November 2005.
