= LMP-2017 =

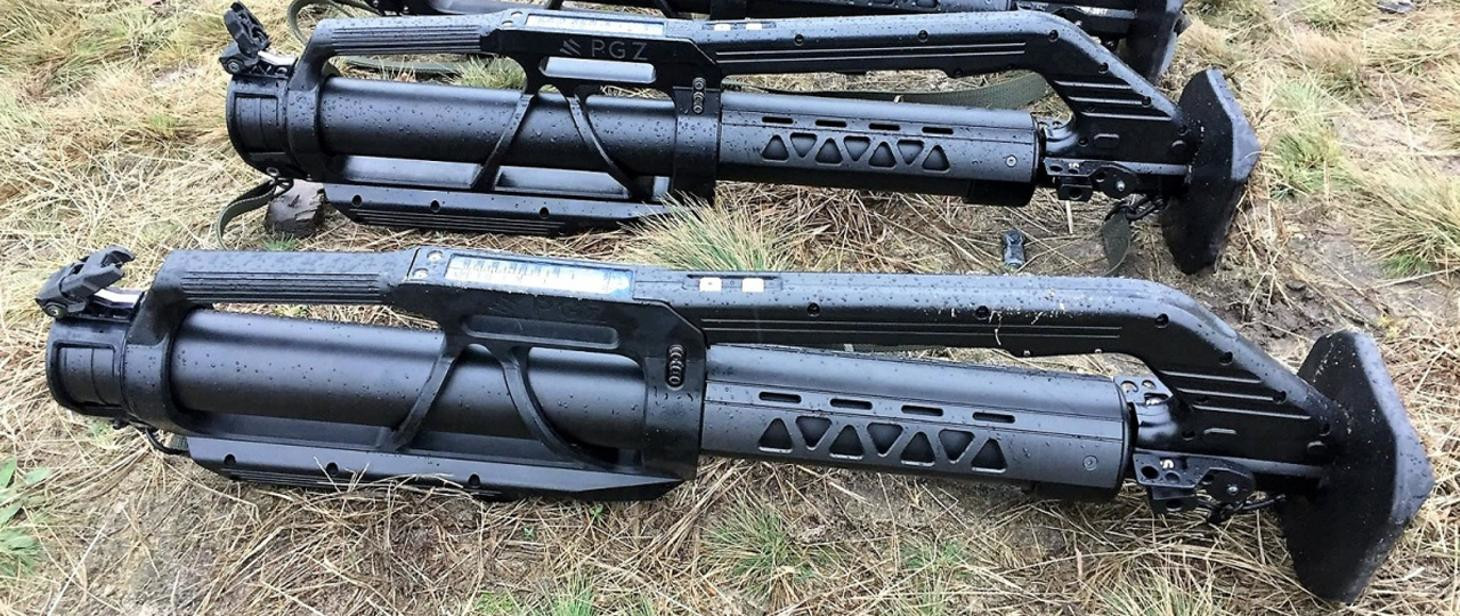
- Type: Mortar
- Place of origin: Poland

Service history
- Used by: Poland; Ukraine
- Wars: Russo-Ukrainian War

Production history
- Designed: 2017
- Manufacturer: ZM „Tarnów”
- Variants: LMP-2017; LMP-2017M

Specifications
- Mass: 6,6 kg (LMP-2017); 19 kg (LMP-2017M)
- Barrel length: 650 mm (LMP-2017); 865 mm (LMP-2017M)
- Crew: 1-2
- Caliber: 60 mm and 61 mm
- Rate of fire: 25 shots per minute
- Effective firing range: 1300 m (LMP-2017); 3000 m (LMP-2017M)

The LMP-2017 is a 60mm mortar that is produced by Zakłady Mechaniczne Tarnów.

== History and deployment ==
The mortar is intended mainly for Territorial Defense Force units, in December 2018 a contract was signed for the delivery of 780 pieces by 2022. It is the successor to the LM-60K and LRM vz. 99 ANTOS mortars. The first 150 units were delivered in 2019, 204 in 2020, 294 in 2021 and the last of this order in 2022, 132 units.

In February 2022, an undisclosed number of LMP-2017 mortars were transferred to Ukraine (estimated at 100 units with over 1,500 grenades), where they soon saw their first combat use during the Russian invasion of Ukraine.

== Design overview ==
Designed as a direct support weapon, it can be operated by one soldier (normal operation is two soldiers). The firing range is 100 to 1300 meters, the rate of fire is 25 rounds per minute without re-adjusting settings or 10 rounds per minute with re-adjusting the aim. The barrel length is 650 mm. The barrel is made of steel, the backing plate is made of duralumin, the bolt is made of titanium and aluminum, the bed and body are made of polymer. The mortar weighs 6.6 kg.

The LMP-2017 has a mechanical sight, and in addition, depending on the version, a liquid or digital sight.

For logistical reasons, the mortar barrel and the sight scale were designed to be interchangeable. Initially, a 60 mm (59.4 mm) caliber barrel is installed, adapted to the existing Polish Pluton-1 ammunition. Once it is depleted, barrels adapted to the NATO standard of 61 mm (60.7 mm) will be used. In addition to the O-LM60 fragmentation grenades, weighing 2 kg, with one additional propellant charge, reaching a range of 1100 m, the mortar uses O-LM60N grenades with two additional propellant charges, with a range of 1300 m. S-LM60 illuminating grenades with a range of 700 m are also used.

The mortar version is a heavier version of the LMP-2017M, with a longer barrel (865 mm), in a classic arrangement with a bipod and a backing plate, which is the successor to the LM-60D mortar. Its range is up to 3,000 m, with the use of an optical sight. The mortar can also be used as a commando, without a bipod and with a different backing plate, using a digital sight, to fire at a distance of up to 1,500 meters.

== Users ==
- Poland
- Ukraine – about 100 mortars and 1,500 rounds of ammunition.
