= Polish Armed Forces =

Combined military forces of Poland

Armed Forces of the Republic of Poland
- Siły Zbrojne Rzeczypospolitej Polskiej
- Banner of the Polish Armed Forces

- Insignia of the Polish Armed Forces' service branches
- Motto: God, Honour, Fatherland (Bóg, Honor, Ojczyzna)
- Founded: 12 October 1918
- Current form: 31 December 1989
- Service branches: Land Forces; Air Force; Navy; Special Forces; Territorial Defence Force
- Headquarters: Warsaw
- Website: www.wojsko-polskie.pl

Leadership
- Commander-in-chief: President Karol Nawrocki
- Minister of National Defence: Władysław Kosiniak-Kamysz
- Chief of the General Staff: General Wiesław Kukuła

Personnel
- Military age: 18 years of age
- Conscription: No
- Active personnel: ~220,000
- Reserve personnel: ~350,000

Expenditure
- Budget: PLN200 billion US$55.0 billion
- Percent of GDP: 4.7% (2025)

Industry
- Domestic suppliers: PGZ; PGZ Stocznia Wojenna; PZL Mielec; PZL-Świdnik; PIT-RADWAR; BUMAR-ŁABĘDY; HSW; WZM; Rosomak; JELCZ; OBRUM; MESKO; DEZAMET; BELMA; ZM Tarnów; FB Radom; PCO; MASKPOL; TELDAT; WB Group
- Foreign suppliers: United States; South Korea; Germany; United Kingdom; Sweden; France; Spain; Israel; Italy; Croatia; Czech Republic; European Union; NATO

Related articles
- History: List of wars involving Poland; Timeline of the Polish Army
- Ranks: Polish Armed Forces rank insignia

The Armed Forces of the Republic of Poland (Polish: Siły Zbrojne Rzeczypospolitej Polskiej, pronounced [ˈɕiwɨ ˈzbrɔjnɛ ʐɛt͡ʂpɔsˈpɔlitɛj ˈpɔlskʲɛj]; abbreviated SZ RP), also called the Polish Armed Forces (Wojsko Polskie, [ˈvɔj.skɔ ˈpɔl.skjɛ], WP, lit. 'Polish Military'), are the national armed forces of the Republic of Poland. The name has been used since the early 1800s, but can also be applied to earlier periods.

The Polish Legions and the Blue Army, composed of Polish volunteers from the United States and those who switched sides from the Central Powers, were formed during World War I. In the war's aftermath, the Polish Army was reformed from the remnants of the partitioning powers' forces and expanded significantly during the Polish–Soviet War of 1920. World War II dramatically impacted Polish military structures, with the initial defeat by Nazi Germany and the Soviet Union invasions leading to the dispersion of Polish forces into the underground. After the war, the Polish People's Army (LWP) was formed, and its standards aligned with those of the former Warsaw Pact. The LWP's reputation suffered due to its role in political suppression both domestically and abroad, such as during the Prague Spring. Following the fall of communism, Poland shifted towards Western military standards, joining NATO in 1999, participating in missions in Iraq and Afghanistan, and undertaking substantial modernisation of its forces.

The Armed Forces of the Republic of Poland comprise five main service branches: the Polish Land Forces (Wojska Lądowe), the Polish Navy (Marynarka Wojenna), the Polish Air Force (Siły Powietrzne), the Polish Special Forces (Wojska Specjalne), and the Polish Territorial Defence Force (Wojska Obrony Terytorialnej), under the command of the Ministry of National Defence of Poland. According to the Stockholm International Peace Research Institute, Poland spent $46.8 billion on its defense budget in 2025, ranking 14th globally in terms of military expenditures.

In 2025, Poland spent the greatest share of its GDP for military expenditures (4.2%) among all NATO members. With over 216,100 active personnel in 2024, the Polish Armed Forces are the third-largest military in NATO, right after Turkey and the United States.

== Mission ==
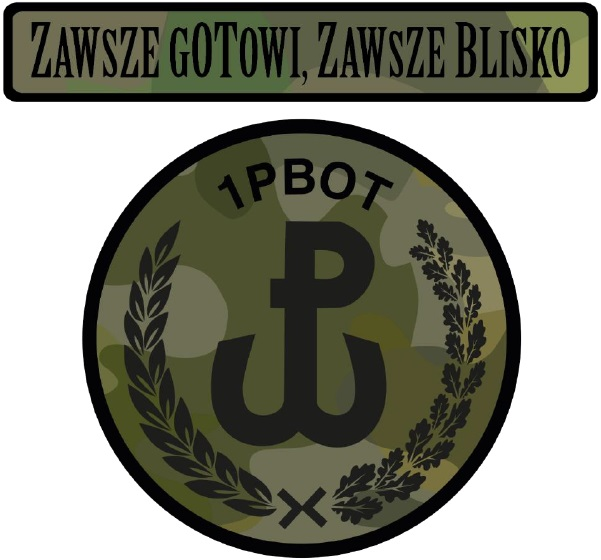
Shoulder sleeve insignia of the Polish Territorial Defence Force Command

Pursuant to the national security strategy of Poland, the supreme strategic goal of Poland's military forces is to ensure favourable and secure conditions for the realisation of national interests by eliminating external and internal threats, reducing risks, rightly assessing undertaken challenges, and ably using existing opportunities. The Republic of Poland's main strategic goals in the area of defence include:

- Ensuring the independence and sovereignty of the Republic of Poland, as well as its integrity and the inviolability of its borders
- Defence and protection of all the citizens of the Republic of Poland
- Creating conditions to ensure the continuity of the implementation of functions by public administration authorities and other entities competent in the area of national security, including entities responsible for running the economy and for other areas important for the life and security of its citizens
- Creating conditions for the improvement of the state's national defence capabilities and ensuring defence readiness in allied structures
- Developing partnership military cooperation with other states, especially neighbouring ones
- Implementing commitments arising from Poland's NATO and European Union membership
- Engaging in international crisis response operations led by NATO, the EU, the UN, and as a part of emergency coalitions

== History ==
=== Origins and establishment ===
The List of Polish wars chronicles Polish military involvement in armed conflicts since the year 972. The present armed forces trace their roots to the early 20th century, yet the history of Polish armed forces in their broadest sense stretches back much further. After the partitions of Poland, during the period from 1795 to 1918, the Polish military was recreated several times during national insurrections that included the November Uprising of 1830, the January Uprising in 1863, and the Napoleonic Wars that saw the formation of the Polish Legions in Italy. Congress Poland, being part of the Russian Empire with a certain degree of autonomy, had a separate Polish army in the years 1815–1830, which was disbanded after the unsuccessful November Uprising. Large numbers of Poles also served in the armies of the partitioning powers, the Russian Empire, Austria-Hungary, and the German Empire.

During World War I, the Polish Legions were set up in Galicia, the southern part of Poland under Austrian occupation. They were both disbanded after the Central Powers failed to provide guarantees of Polish independence after the war. General Józef Haller, the commander of the Second Brigade of the Polish Legion, switched sides in late 1917 and, via Murmansk, took part of his troops to France, where he created the Blue Army. It was joined by several thousand Polish volunteers from the United States. It fought on the French front in 1917 and 1918.

The Polish Army was recreated in 1918 from elements of the three separate Russian, Austro-Hungarian, and German armies, and armed with equipment left following World War I. The force expanded during the Polish–Soviet War of 1919–1922 to nearly 800,000 men, but was then reduced after peace was reestablished.

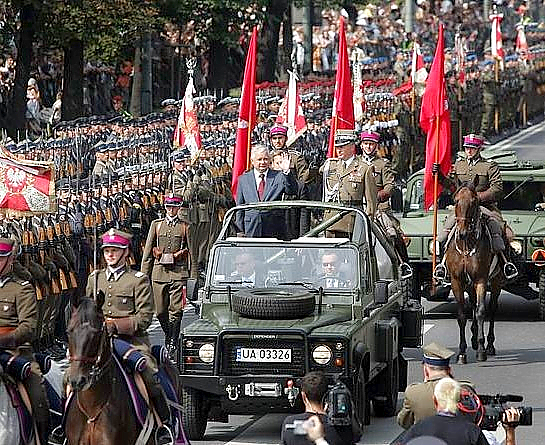
President of Poland inspecting troops during the Armed Forces Day parade in Warsaw, 2007

At the onset of World War II, on 1 September 1939, Nazi Germany invaded Poland. Polish forces were overwhelmed by the German attack in September 1939, which was followed on 17 September 1939 by an invasion by the Soviet Union. Some Polish forces escaped from the occupied country and joined Allied forces fighting in other theaters, while those that remained in Poland splintered into guerrilla units of the Armia Krajowa ("Home Army") and other partisan groups which fought in clandestine ways against the foreign occupiers. Thus, there were three threads to the Polish armed forces from 1939: the Polish Armed Forces in the West, the Armia Krajowa and other resistance organizations fighting the Germans in Poland, and the Polish Armed Forces in the East, which later became the post-war communist Polish People's Army (LWP).

Until the fall of communism, the army's prestige under communist rule continued to fall, as it was used by the government to resettle ethnic minorities immediately after the war (Operation Vistula), and to violently suppress opposition several times, during the 1956 Poznań protests, the 1970 Polish protests, and during martial law in Poland in 1981–1983. The LWP also took part in the suppression of the 1968 democratisation process of Czechoslovakia, commonly known as the Prague Spring. That same year, Marshal of Poland Marian Spychalski was asked to replace Edward Ochab as chairman of the Council of State, and General Wojciech Jaruzelski, at that time the Chief of the General Staff, was named to replace him. Jaruzelski, a known Soviet loyalist, was put in place by the Soviets in order to ensure that a trusted group of officers was in control of one of the least trusted armies in the Warsaw Pact.

=== Republic of Poland ===
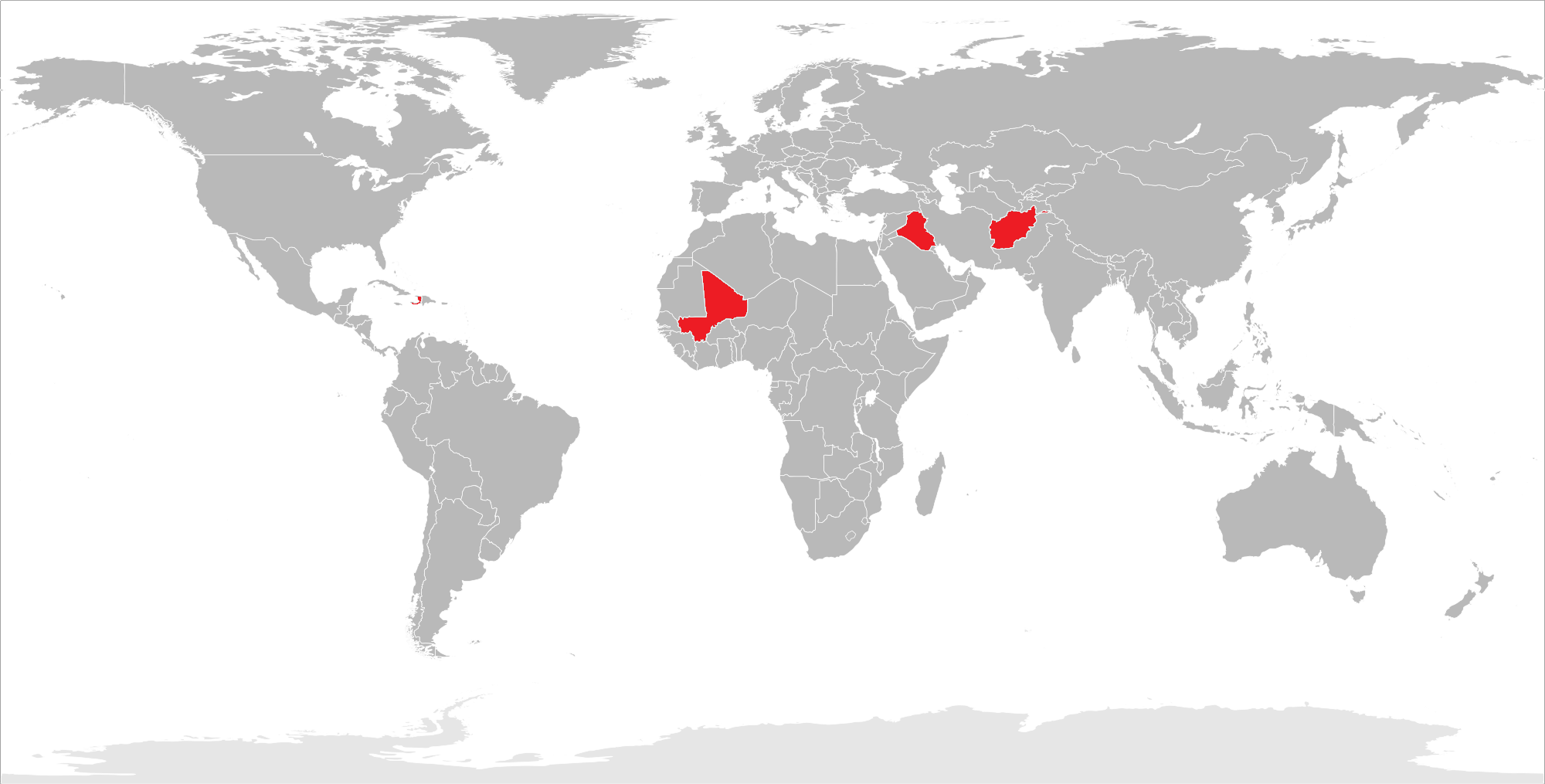
Polish military interventions since 1990: Gulf War, Operation Uphold Democracy, war on terror, and Operation Serval

After January 1990 and the collapse of the communist bloc, the name of the armed forces was changed to "Armed Forces of the Republic of Poland" to accord with the Polish State's new official name. Following the subsequent disbandment of the Warsaw Pact, Poland was admitted into NATO on 12 March 1999, and the Polish armed forces began a major reorganisation effort in order to conform to the new Western standards.

==== Involvement in Afghanistan (2002-2014) ====
From 2002 until 2014, Polish military forces were dispatched to the International Security Assistance Force mission in Afghanistan, led by NATO. Poland's contribution to ISAF was the country's largest since its entrance into NATO. Polish forces also took part in the Iraq War. From 2003 to 2008, Polish military forces commanded the Multinational Division Central-South (MND-CS) located in the South-Central Occupation Zone of Iraq. The division consisted of troops from 23 states and totaled as many as 8,500 soldiers.

==== Invasion of Iraq (2003) ====
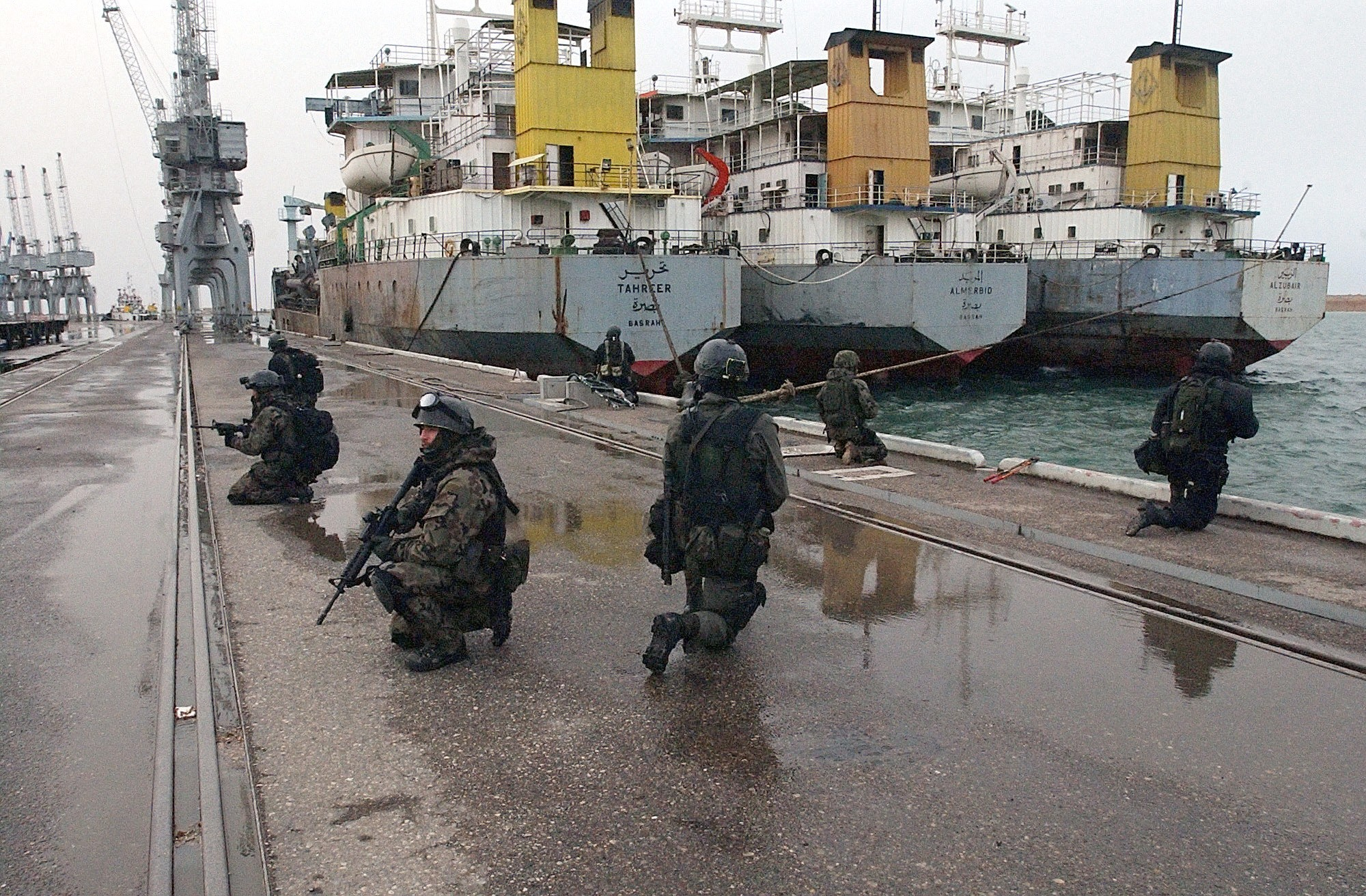
GROM special operations unit secures a section of the port of Umm Qasr in Iraq, 2003

In March 2003, the Polish Armed Forces took part in the 2003 invasion of Iraq, deploying special forces and a support ship. Following the destruction of Saddam's regime, the Polish Land Forces supplied a brigade and a division headquarters for the 17-nation Multinational Division Central-South, part of the U.S.-led Multi-National Force – Iraq. At its peak, Poland had 2,500 soldiers in the south of the country.

==== Peacekeeping missions ====
Other completed operations include the 2005 'Swift Relief' in Pakistan, in which NATO Response Force-allocated personnel were dispatched. Polish Land Forces personnel sent to Pakistan included a military engineering company, a platoon of the 1st Special Commando Regiment, and a logistics component from the 10th Logistics Brigade. Elsewhere, Polish forces were sent to MINURCAT in Chad and the Central African Republic (2007–2010).

As of 2008, Poland had deployed 985 personnel in eight separate UN peacekeeping operations (the United Nations Disengagement Observer Force, MINURSO, MONUC, UNOCI, UNIFIL, UNMEE, UNMIK, UNMIL, and UNOMIG).

==== Fully professional armed forces (2010) ====
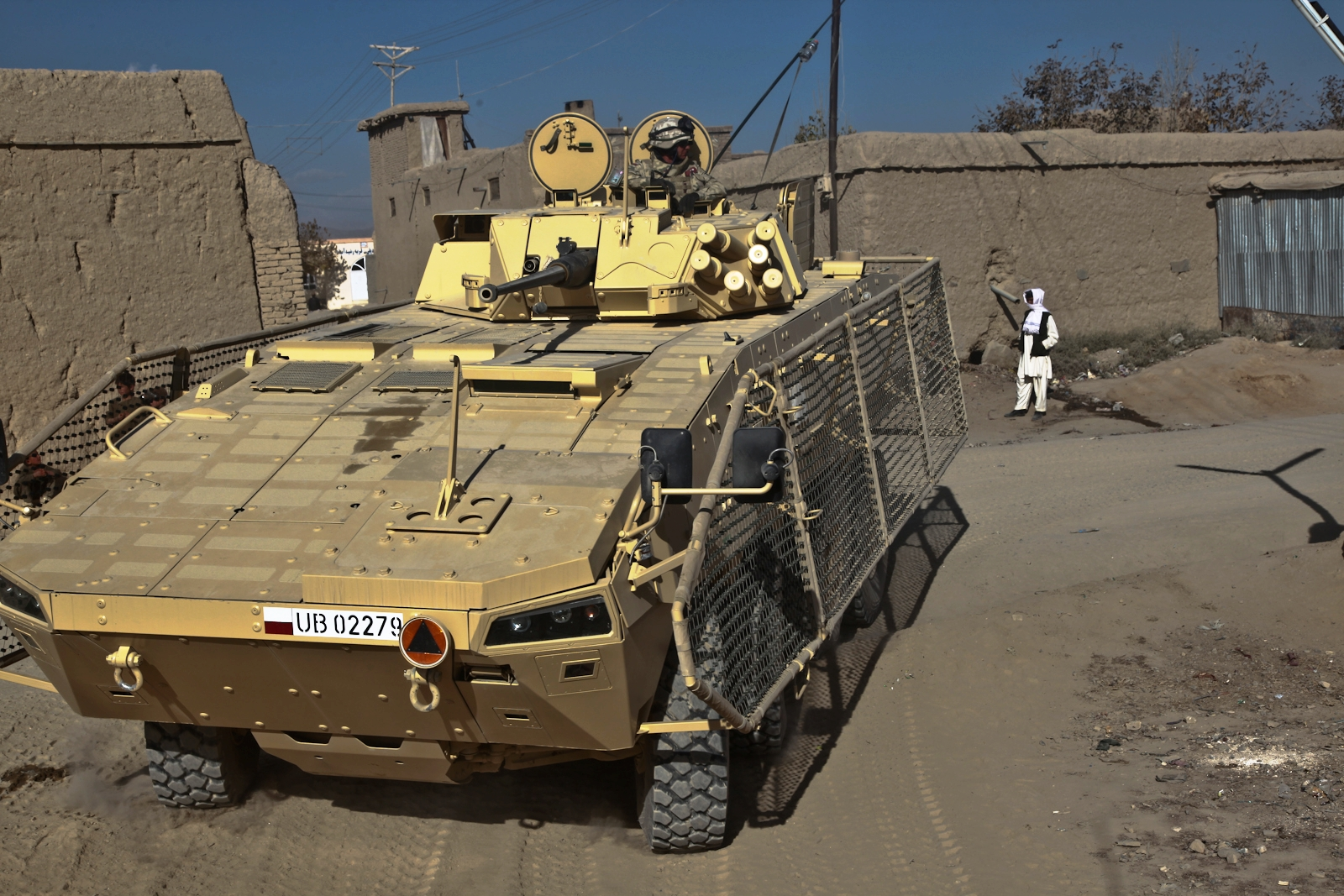
Polish army's Rosomak armoured vehicle on patrol in Ghazni, Afghanistan, 2010

Formerly set up according to Warsaw Pact standards, the Polish armed forces are now fully organised according to NATO requirements. Poland is also playing an increasingly larger role as a major European peacekeeping power in the world through various UN peacekeeping actions, and cooperation with neighboring nations through multinational formations and units such as the Multinational Corps Northeast and POLUKRBAT. As of 1 January 2010, the Armed Forces of the Republic of Poland have transitioned to a completely contract-based manpower supply system.

On 10 April 2010, a Polish Air Force Tu-154M crashed near Smolensk, Russia, while it was travelling to a ceremony commemorating the Katyn massacre. On board the plane were the President (Commander-in-Chief), the Chief of Staff, all four Branch Commanders of the Polish Military, and a number of other military officials; all were killed.

In 2014–2015, the Armed Forces General Command and Armed Forces Operational Command were both established, superseding the previous individual service branch command structures.

==== Homeland Defence Act (2022) ====
Prompted in part by the 2022 Russian invasion of Ukraine, the Homeland Defence Act was unanimously passed by the Polish parliament on March 17, 2022, and signed into law by President Andrzej Duda the following day. In accordance with the act, Poland intends to roughly double the size of the armed forces to 300,000 personnel, and to spend at least 3% of GDP on the defence budget in 2023. This includes increasing the size of the tank fleet by adding approximately 1,000 new tanks and adding 600 new howitzers to Poland's ground forces. Poland's Deputy Prime Minister and Defense Minister Mariusz Błaszczak said that it is Poland's goal to build the most powerful ground forces of all the North Atlantic Treaty Organisation members in Europe.

== Equipment ==
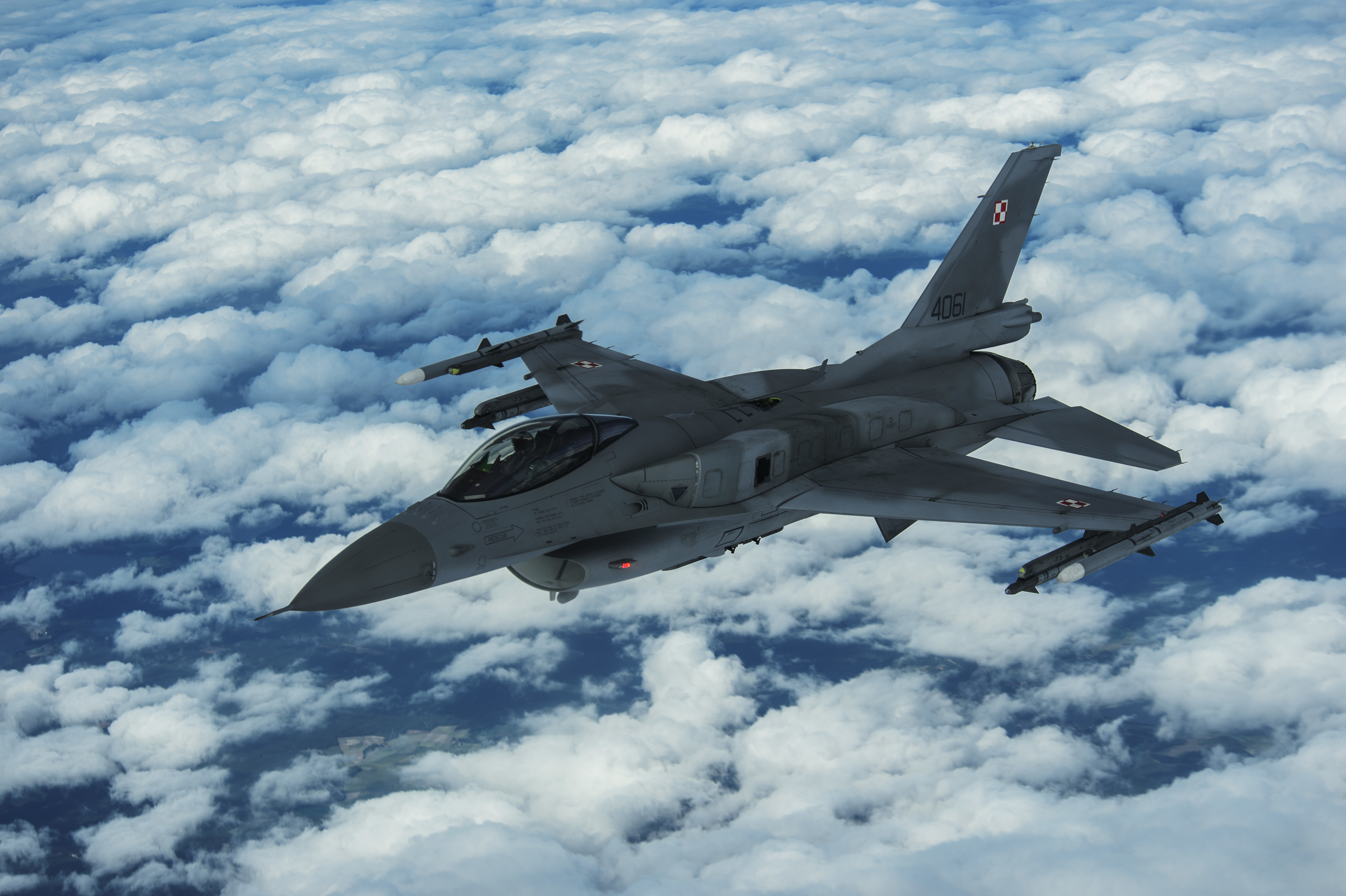
A Polish Air Force F-16C Fighting Falcon during a military exercise, 2017

Since 2011, the Armed Forces have been in the middle of a long-term modernisation program. Plans involve new anti-aircraft missile systems, ballistic missile defense systems, a Lead-In Fighter Trainer (LIFT) aircraft, medium transport and combat helicopters, submarines, unmanned aerial vehicles, as well as self-propelled howitzers. Technical modernisation plans for the years 2013 through to 2022 have been put in place. During the 2013 to 2016 period of the plan, 37.8 billion PLN, or 27.8% of the period's military budget of 135.5 billion PLN, was invested into technical modernisation.

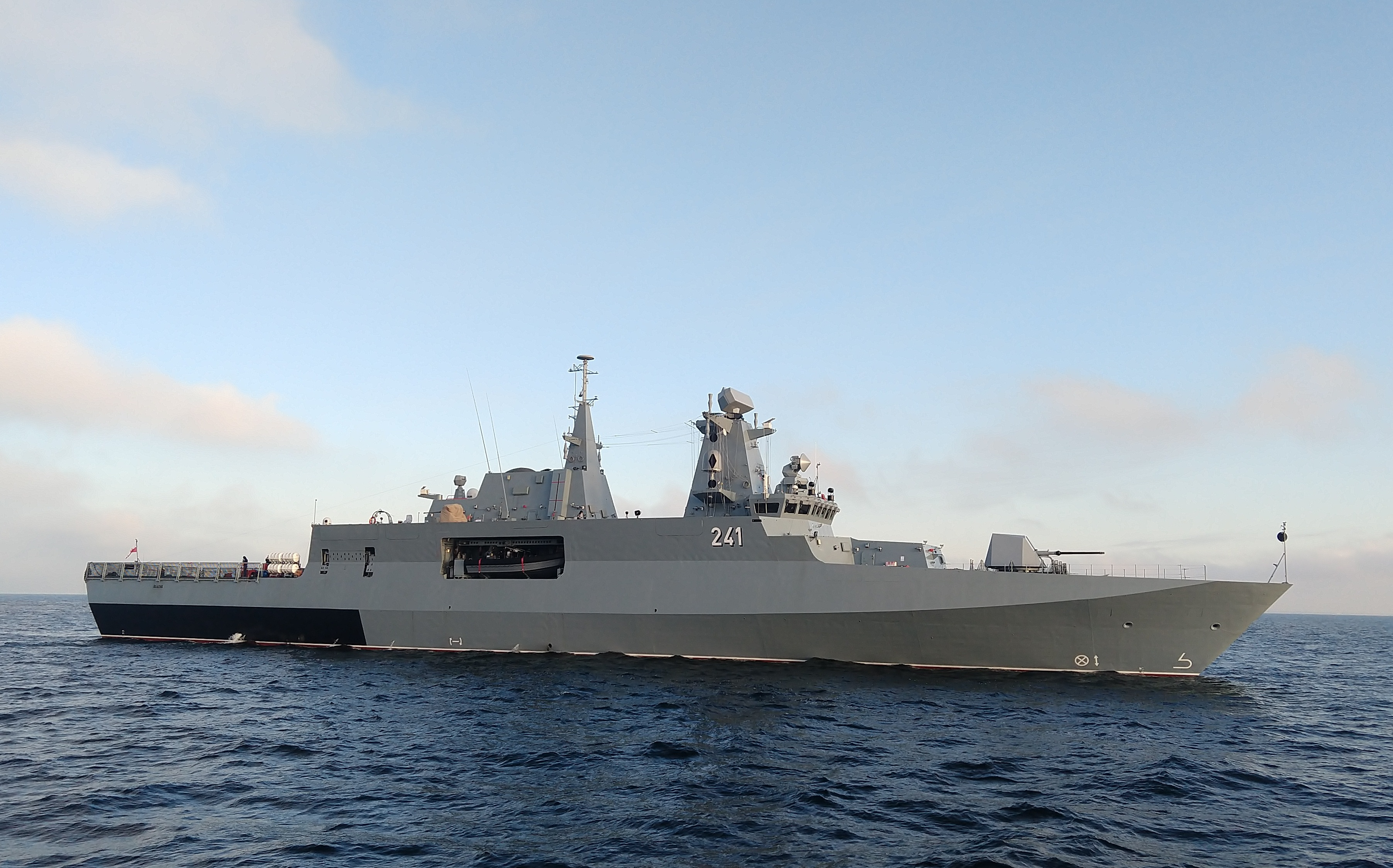
ORP Ślązak offshore patrol vessel in the Baltic Sea, 2015

Significant military equipment acquisitions are also planned for through the 2022 period, with the Ministry of Defence outlining 61 billion złoty to be spent on further modernisation. A major feature of the program is the acquisition of around 1,200 unmanned aerial vehicles, including at least 1,000 with combat capabilities.

Additionally, new helicopters and air defence systems are to be procured along with five light vessels for the navy. A new submarine force is to be jointly operated with a NATO partner, and general upgrade and modernisation efforts are aimed at the country's air defenses, naval forces, cyber warfare capabilities, armoured forces, and territorial defence forces (to have 50,000 volunteer members).

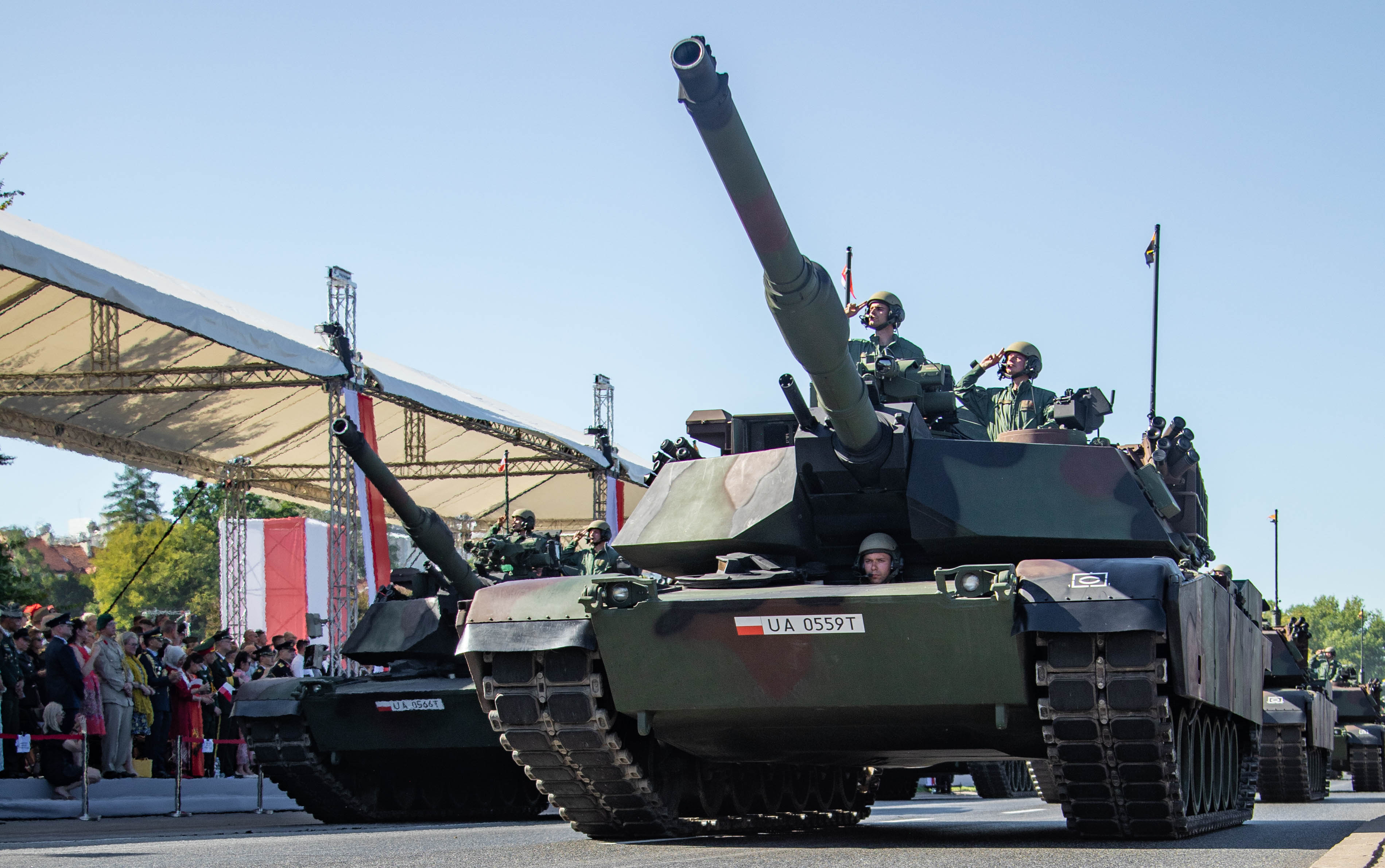
Polish M1 Abrams tanks during the Armed Forces Day parade in Warsaw, 2023

== Organization ==
The Polish Armed Forces consist of 292,000+ active duty personnel. In 2023, troop strength in the five different branches was as follows:

- Land Forces (Wojska Lądowe): 100,200, Reserve 40,000+
- Air Force (Siły Powietrzne): 46,500
- Navy (Marynarka Wojenna): 17,000
- Special Forces (Wojska Specjalne): 4,000
- Territorial Defence Force (Wojska Obrony Terytorialnej): 55,000

All five branches are supported by:

- Military infrastructure: 25,500, including:
  - Ministry of National Defence of the Republic of Poland (Ministerstwo Obrony Narodowej)
  - Central support
  - Military command
  - Supply and military logistics
- Military Gendarmerie (Żandarmeria Wojskowa): 4,500

== Traditions ==
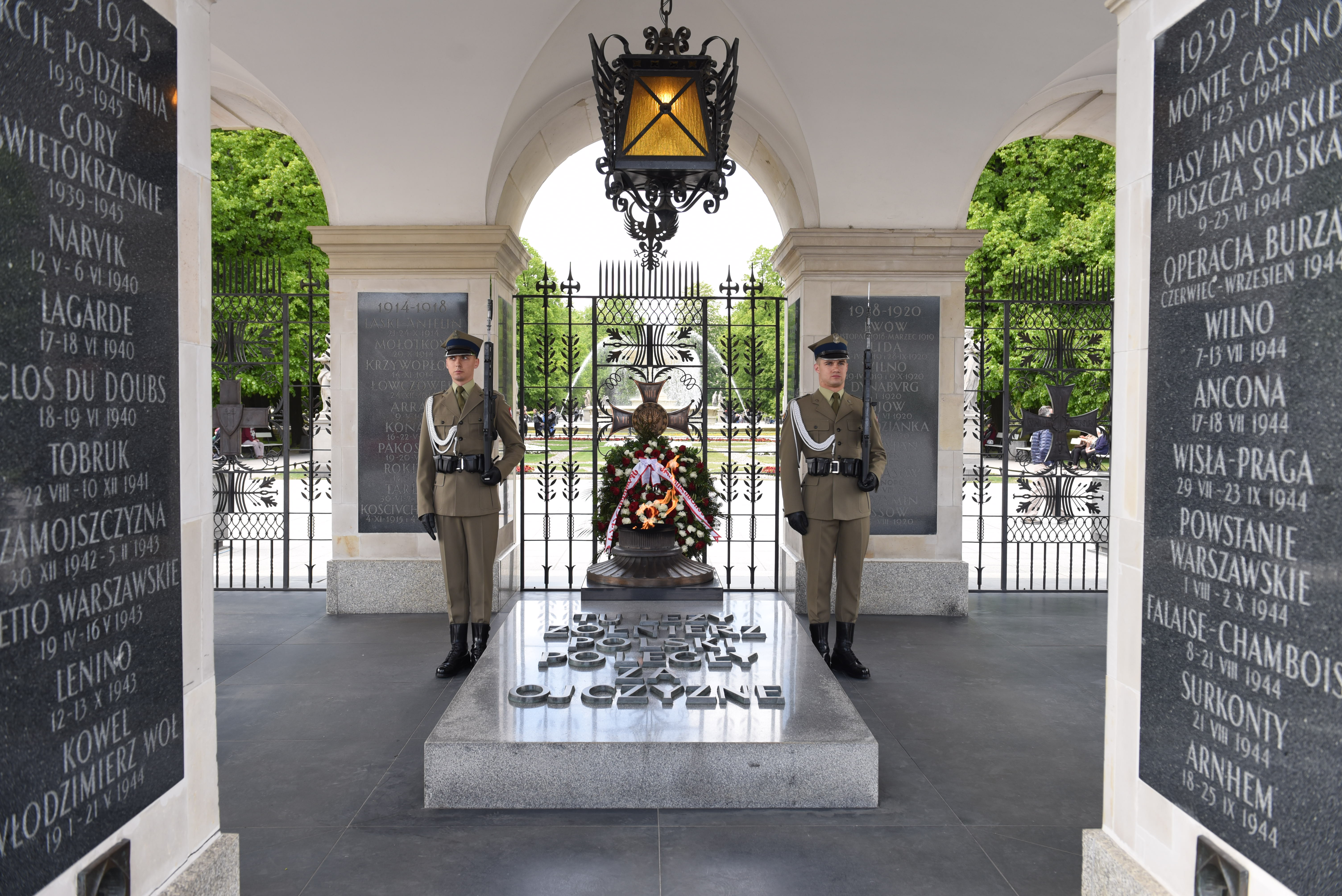
Honour Guard at the Tomb of the Unknown Soldier in Warsaw's Piłsudski Square

The Polish armed forces have consistently held two yearly military parades (Polish: Defilada wojskowa) on Armed Forces Day and National Independence Day. These parades take place on Ujazdów Avenue and near the Tomb of the Unknown Soldier on Piłsudski Square, respectively. The Armed Forces Day Parade was introduced in 2007 and 2008 as the first grand military parades since the holiday was reinstated and has been held yearly since 2013. The first Polish military parade took place on 17 January 1945, and as of 2019, the 3 May Constitution Day parade was officially reinstated.

Marsz Generalski and Warszawianka (1831) are the main military musical pieces performed at ceremonial events. While the former is a solemn march used during inspections and the march on of the Polish flag, the latter is a march strictly used for marches pasts, military parades, and other processions.

The Polish Armed Forces are the only military entity in the world to use a two-finger salute, which is only used while wearing a hat (it refers to the fact that the salute is given to the emblem itself) with the emblem of the Polish eagle, such as military hat, rogatywka. The salute is performed with the middle and index fingers extended and touching each other, while the ring and little fingers are bent and touched by the thumb. The tips of the middle and index fingers touch the peak of the cap, two fingers supposedly meaning Honour and Fatherland (Honor i Ojczyzna).

Czołem Żołnierze (the Polish language version of Greetings Soldiers) is the official military greeting of the armed forces, usually given by the members of the government or military establishment, as well as visiting dignitaries during ceremonial occasions. The soldiers will usually respond with Czołem (States title/rank of dignitary).

== See also ==
- Polish Armed Forces (Second Polish Republic)
- Polish People's Army
- Main Directorate of Information of the Polish Army (GZI WP)
- Internal Military Service (WSW)
- Border Protection Troops (WOP)
- Polish Legions (Napoleonic era)
- Polish Military Organisation
- Armia Ludowa
- Gwardia Ludowa
- Polish forces in the West
- Polish forces in the East
  - Anders' Army
- First Polish Army (1944–1945)
- Armia Krajowa
