= PT-91 Twardy =

Polish main battle tank

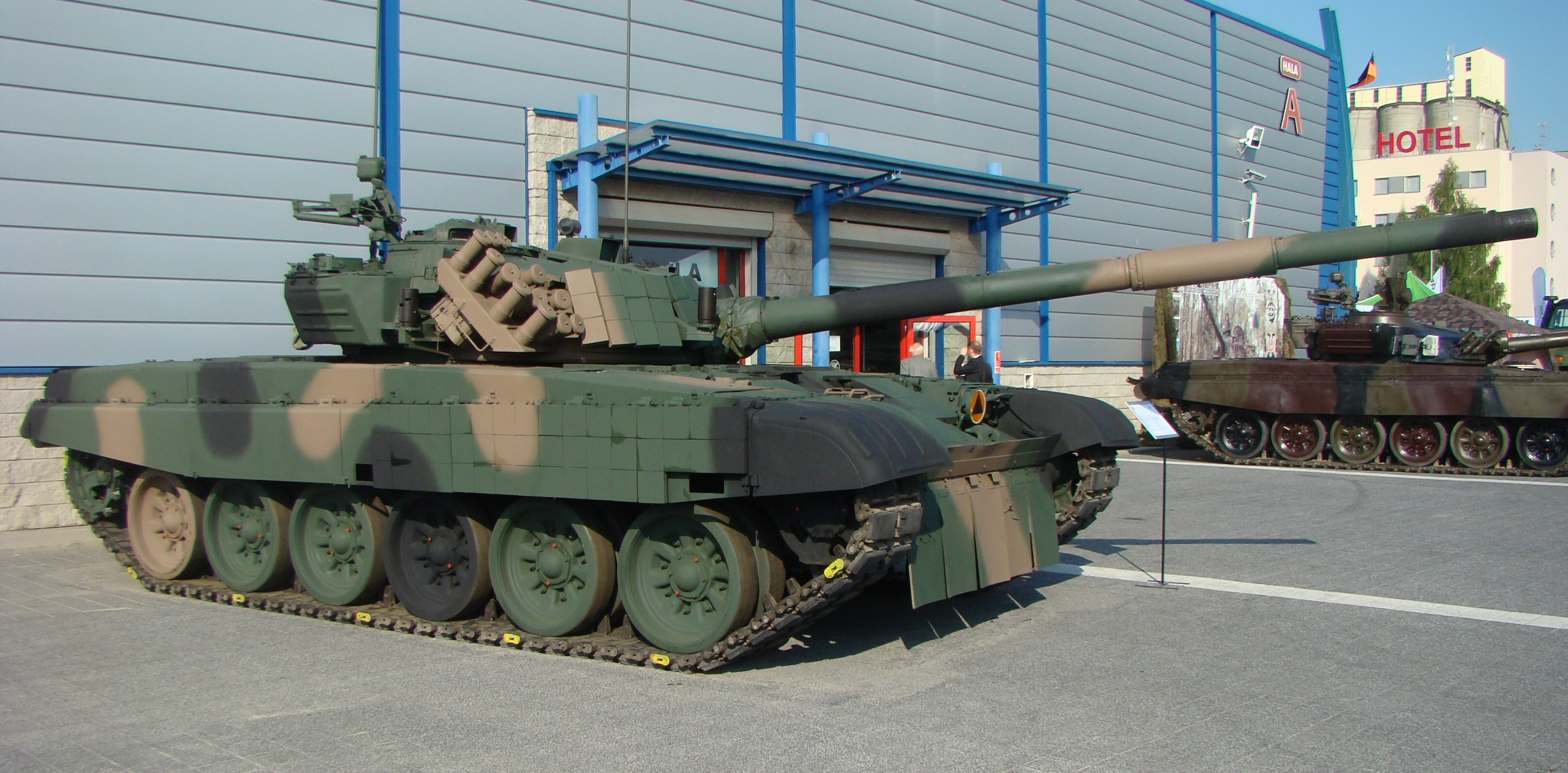
- PT-91 Twardy
- Type: Main battle tank
- Place of origin: Poland

Service history
- Used by: See Users
- Wars: Russo-Ukrainian War; Russian invasion of Ukraine

Production history
- Manufacturer: Bumar-Łabędy
- No. built: Around 285

Specifications
- Mass: 45.9 tonnes (101,000 lb)
- Length: 6.95 m (9.67 with barrel in forward position)
- Width: 3.59 m
- Height: 2.19 m
- Crew: 3
- Armor: Composite armour; front and side armour laminated; front, side and top armour behind Erawa-1/Erawa-2 ERA, steel side anti-cumulative screens
- Main armament: 1 × 125 mm 2A46 (D-81TM) gun (42 rounds)
- Secondary armament: 1 × 7.62mm PKT coaxial general-purpose machine gun (2,000 rounds); 1 × 12.7 mm NSVT heavy machine gun (300 rounds)
- Engine: PZL-Wola S-12U diesel 850 hp (630 kW)
- Power/weight: 18.5 hp/tonne (13.8 kW/tonne)
- Transmission: Manual
- Suspension: torsion-bar
- Ground clearance: 395 mm
- Fuel capacity: 1,000 L
- Operational range: 650 km (700 km with extra fuel tanks)
- Maximum speed: 60 km/h

PT-91M Pendekar
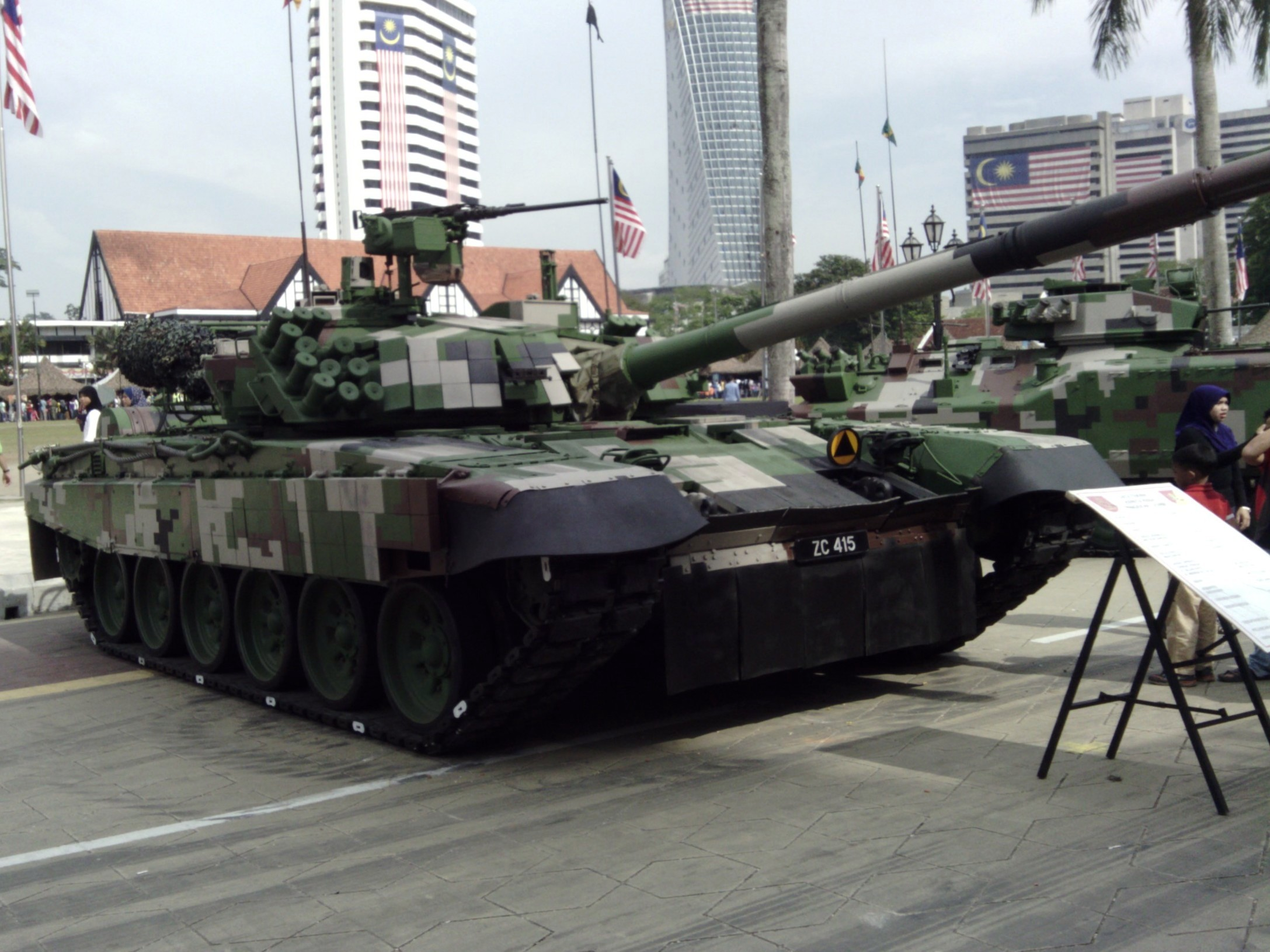
- PT-91M Pendekar of Malaysian Army on display
- Type: Main battle tank
- Place of origin: Poland

Service history
- Used by: Malaysia

Specifications
- Mass: 48.5 tonnes
- Length: 6.86 m (10.03 m with barrel in forward position)
- Width: 3.70 m
- Height: 2.60 m
- Crew: 3
- Armor: Composite armour; front and side armour laminated; front, side and top armour behind Erawa-1/Erawa-2 ERA, steel side anti-cumulative screens
- Main armament: 1 × ZTS 2A46MS 125 mm gun (42 rounds)
- Secondary armament: 1 × 7.62mm FN MAG coaxial general-purpose machine gun (2,000 rounds), 1 x 12.7 mm FN M2 HB anti-aircraft heavy machine gun (250 rounds)
- Engine: PZL-Wola S-1000R diesel 1,000 hp (750 kW)
- Power/weight: 20.6 hp/t (16 kW/t)
- Transmission: Automatic RENK-SESM/ESM-350M
- Suspension: torsion-bar
- Ground clearance: 395 mm
- Maximum speed: 70 km/h

The PT-91 Twardy (Polish pronunciation: [ˈtfar.dɨ], English: Hard) is a Polish main battle tank. A development of the T-72M1, it entered service in 1995. The PT-91 was designed at the OBRUM (Ośrodek Badawczo-Rozwojowy Urządzeń Mechanicznych, or Research and Development Centre for Mechanical Appliances) and is produced by the Bumar Łabędy company, part of the Bumar Group, a Polish technical military consortium. Changes from the T-72M include a new dual-axis stabilized fire-control system, reactive armour, a more powerful engine, transmission and new automatic loader.

Unlike many other T-72 upgrades, Polish Army PT-91s feature elements created almost exclusively by domestic companies, including the new engine, fire control system, and all communication system elements. Many of the elements were used to upgrade existing fleets of T-72 tanks in countries including the Czech Republic (T-72M4 CZ), Georgia (T-72SIM-1), and India (T-72 Ajeya Mk. 2). A total of 232 PT-91 tanks were delivered to the Polish Land Forces: 92 newly built vehicles and 140 from refurbished T-72M and T-72M1 tanks, designated PT-91MA and PT-91MA1, respectively.

== History ==
In the late 1980s, the Polish Army modernized all of its obsolete T-55 tanks to the T-55AM Mérida standard. The successful conversion convinced the General Staff that similar modernization programs could be applied to other Soviet-designed tanks made in Poland and used by the Polish Armed Forces. In late 1988, the decision was made to prepare the modernization of the T-72M1, using experience gained from the production of licensed T-72M (obiekt 172M-E3 – Polish army designation T-72), T-72M1 (obiekt 172M-E5) and T-72M1K (Polish army designation T-72M1D).

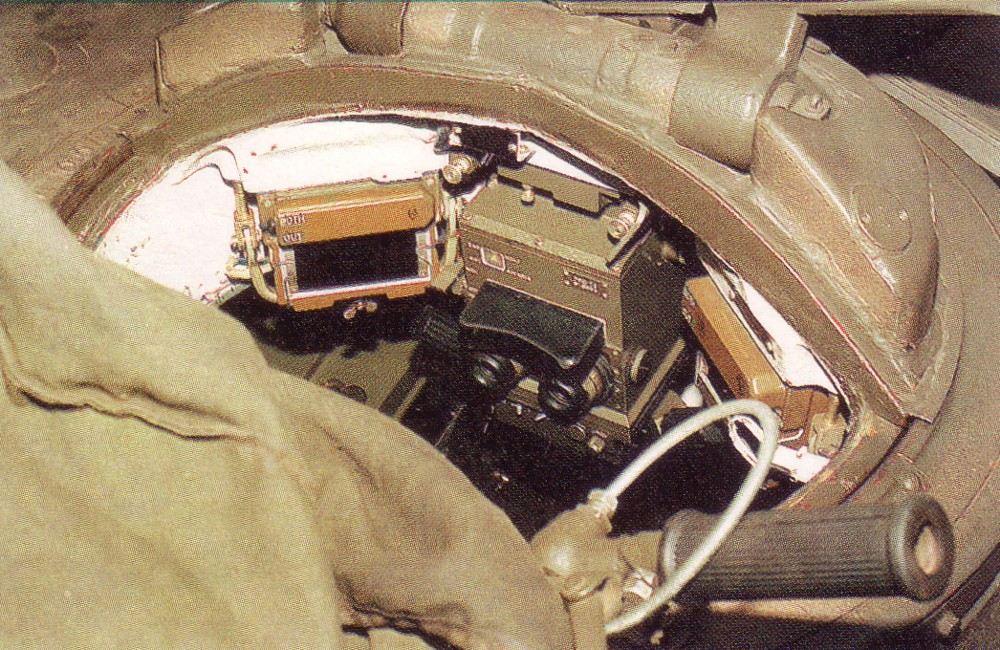
POD-72 commander's sight

The Gliwice-based OBRUM was chosen as the main design bureau. However, initially, the work progressed at a very slow pace, mainly because the Polish General Staff was also considering the purchase of a newer version of the T-72 (T-72S) or the modern T-80.

After the political upheaval of 1989 and dissolution of the Soviet bloc, Polish-Soviet talks on purchase of modern tanks came to a halt and support for designing a new Polish tank gained momentum. The first design proposed by the bureau was code-named Wilk (Polish for wolf), but the project was cancelled. Instead, priority was shifted to a different project named Twardy.

The basic aim of the T-72 conversion was to adapt it to the reality of modern warfare and fix its most visible deficiencies. Among those were low mobility, insufficient armour, lack of a fire control system and poor stabilisation of the main gun, which resulted in poor firing accuracy. An additional problem was the lack of passive night vision aiming systems.

== Development ==
Starting in July 1991, T-72 modernization programs were implemented by the Bumar-Labedy factory, which had been producing T-72s under Soviet license. The modernized main battle tank was designated the PT-91 Twardy. Bumar-Labedy enhanced the tank's armour protection, fire control system and the engine. In 1993, the Polish Defense Ministry ordered 20 PT-91 tanks, to be used for field trials and armed forces tests.

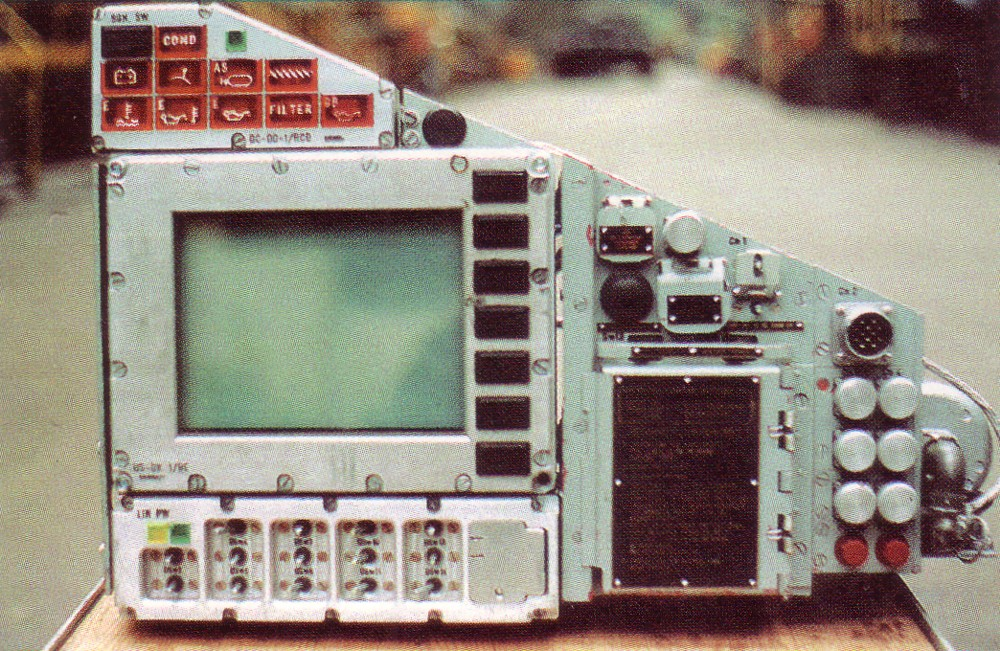
The driver's control panel, US-DK-1

The new ERAWA dynamic armour, developed by the Poland Military-Technical Institute, increased the main battle tank's protection from high-explosive anti-tank (HEAT) projectiles and missiles. The protection consisted of 394 tiles with explosives, which would detonate in case of a direct hit. The tiles cover 9 m^{2} of the tank: 108 are placed on the turret, 118 on the hull and 84 on each side's anti-HEAT screens. The Twardy uses steel anti-HEAT screens instead of the rubber one used on the T-72.

The ERAWA tiles fit together almost without gaps, unlike the gaps on the modernized Soviet T-72 which measure up to 15 mm, noticeably decreasing their defensive effectiveness. There are two ERAWA modifications: ERAWA-1 and -2, differing in weight of the explosives. Experiments showed that the ERAWA dynamic defense decreases the high-explosive jet impact depth by 50–70% and that of penetrator (APFSDS) projectiles by 30–40%. Furthermore, ERAWA's explosive containers do not detonate when hit by a shot of up to 30 mm calibre or by shell or mine fragments, or when covered in burning napalm or petrol.

The Twardy is armed with the same 2A46 125 mm smoothbore gun used in the T-72, fitted with an automatic reloading mechanism which reduces the tank crew by one, as it replaces the gun loader, and gives a rate of fire of 8 to 10 rounds per minute. Additional armament comprises the 7.62 mm PKT coaxial general-purpose machine gun and 12.7 mm NSVT anti-aircraft heavy machine gun. The PT-91 has a thermosmoke device that generates smoke screens from fuel, and has 24 grenade launchers fitted with smoke, anti-personnel fragmentation, or tear gas grenades developed specifically to provide a non-lethal protection.

The modernization of the fire control system began with replacing the older Soviet 2Є28M two-plane stabilizer with a new stabilizer developed in Slovakia. The system has an electronic information block showing the tank's technical condition. Furthermore, it informs the commander when the sighted fire becomes ineffective from excessively high cross-country speed or other reasons.

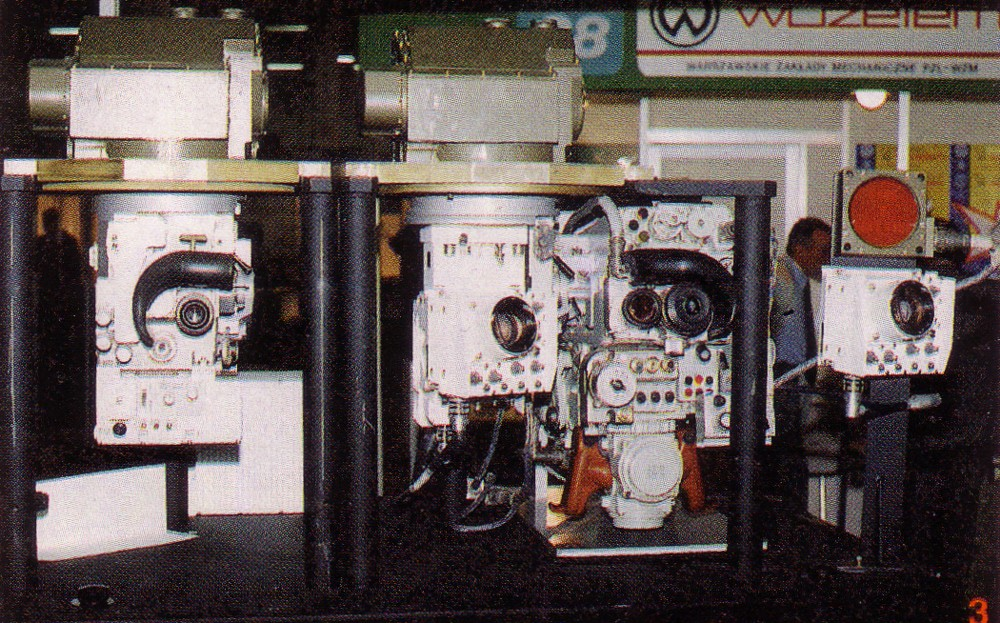
The drawa fire control system

The Drawa (uzbrojenie) fire control system, developed by Polish engineers, contains the PCD gunner's day sight and the TES thermovision night sight developed by the Israeli company El-Op, the POD-72 commander's combined day-night passive observation and aiming sight, a ballistic computer, a laser rangefinder, and a data system processing information for the ballistic computer. The sighting of the ballistic computer depends on the target's speed, weather conditions, projectile temperature, and projectile type.

The driver uses the US-DK-1 control and diagnostic complex to control the tank's main systems, displaying information on a monitor. The driver's night sight was replaced by the Radomka passive night sight.

The modernized tank's increased weight led the developers to add a more powerful engine: a 12-cylinder S-12U diesel engine (a modernized version of the Soviet V-46-6) produced in Warsaw by PZL-Wola, generating 850 hp instead of 780. The main improvement is the modernized fuel and air injection system. This caused, however, a noticeable decrease in the tank's road endurance. The latest Twardy variants have the 1,000 hp S-1000 engine with a turbocharger.

== Variants ==
=== PT-91 Twardy ===
Production variant for the Polish Army, an extensively modernized development of the T-72M1. Most are equipped with an SKO-1M Drawa-1T dual-axis stabilized fire control system (with TES – Thermal Elbow Sight; the total number of delivered thermal sights is 202) though some early production vehicles have a SKO-1 Drawa (with NV sight), Erawa reactive armour, a PCO SSC-1 Obra-1 laser-warning system and 850 hp PZL-Wola S-12U engine. The first 20 initial production vehicles were delivered to Polish Land Forces in 1993–1994. Another 78 full-scale production vehicles were delivered 1995–1997, 135 modernized T-72M1 tanks (made in the late 80s) were delivered between 1998 and 2002. Both new and modernized tanks have the same combat capabilities. The Polish Army uses PT-91s in 3 variants– PT-91, PT-91MA and the PT-91MA1.

=== PT-91A Twardy ===
Development variant with a PZL-Wola S-1000 1,000 hp engine with mechanic transmission and a number of other minor changes. Used for trials and as a demonstrator on military exhibitions.

=== PT-91Z Hardy ===
(Z for Zmodernizowany – literally Modernized) Further development with a SAGEM Savan-15 fire control system. In live-fire tests the Savan-15 has a minor advantage in accuracy over the Drawa. The biggest advantage is a new gun stabilization system that provides a significant increase in accuracy when the tank is on the move. Later it was used as a base to develop the PT-91M. This variant has won a number of stress tests in Malaysia over the T-90, T-84 and K1 tanks, and has won the competition for a new Malaysian MBT. Only one prototype was made.

=== PT-91M Pendekar ===
(M for Malaysia) Production export variant for Malaysia with a Sagem Savan-15 fire control system, a new 1,000 hp powerpack, and a Renk automatic transmission, bringing its top speed to 70 km/h. Its main gun has been changed to a ZTS 2A46MS 125 mm gun, along with a 7.62 mm FN MAG coaxial machine gun and a 12.7 mm FN Browning M2 HB AA machine gun. This variant is equipped with a Sagem panoramic sight, a Sagem laser gyro inertial navigation system, turret stabilisation system, Obra-3 laser-warning system, and is integrated with 81 mm smoke grenade launchers, CBRN warning and protection system, and Thales communication system. It also features ERAWA 2 Explosive Reactive Armour, and German-made tank tracks (Diehl Defence). Two prototypes were made (renamed PT-91E and PT-91Ex), then 48 serial PT-91M Pendekar vehicles were produced from 2007 to 2009.

=== PT-91E/Ex ===
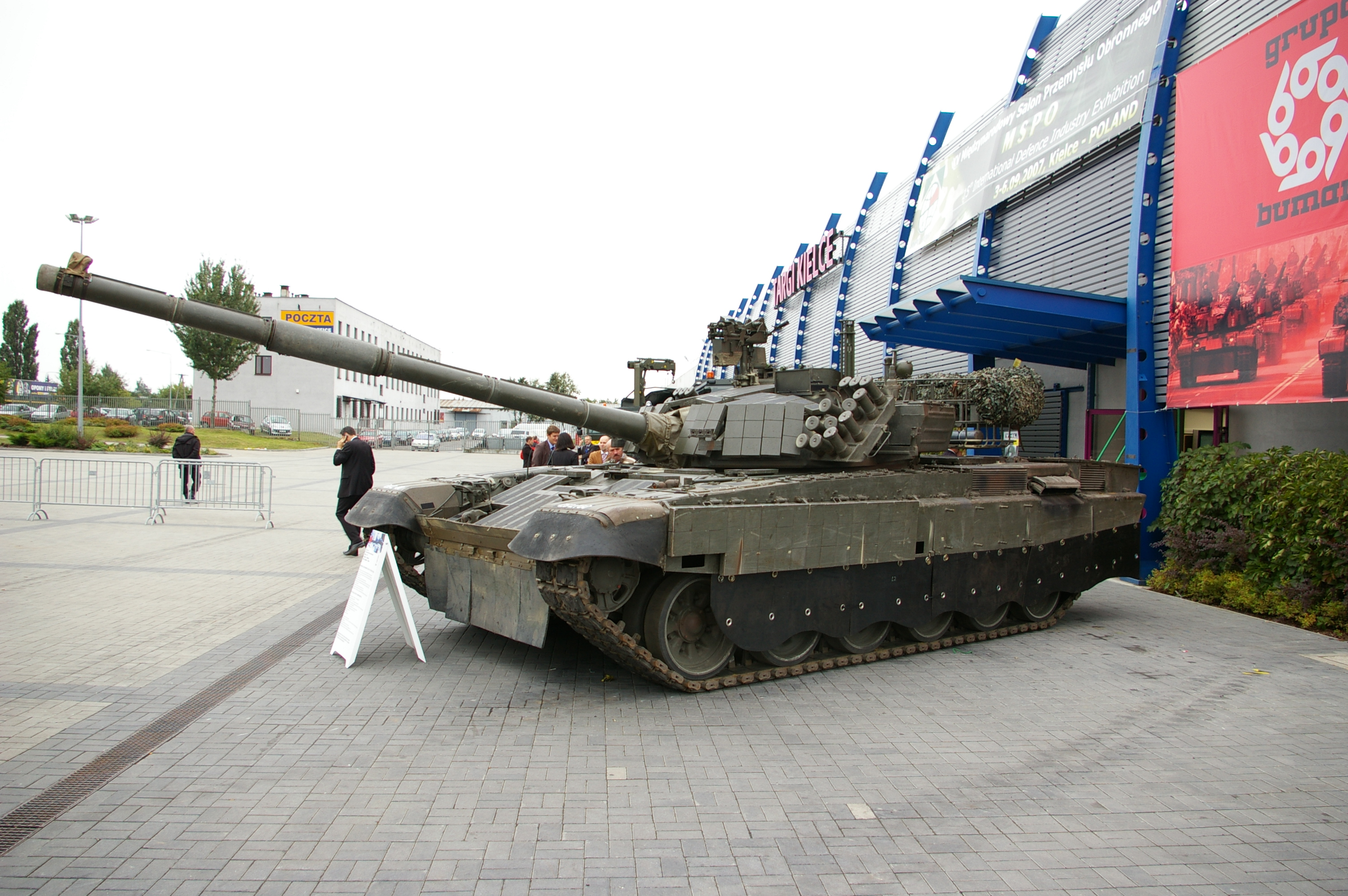
A PT-91E on company display

(E for Export) Renamed prototypes of the PT-91M used as demonstrators of the export variant shown at military exhibitions. The PT-91E is an initial prototype, initially named SP1 (it is the same vehicle that was shown on military parade in Kuala Lumpur in 2005). PT-91Ex is the second prototype, named SP2. Both vehicles faced a number of tests in Malaysia. SP1 was used for traction tests and was driven 7000 km offroad in Malaysia. SP2 achieved 2000 km with 500 firings of the main cannon. The PT-91Ex is very similar to PT-91M, and is offered for export to other countries.

=== PT-91P ===
(P for Peru) A demonstrator for the SITDEF Peru 2009 military exhibition, the PT-91P is a cheaper alternative to the PT-91Ex. This variant is equipped with the latest PCO Drawa-TG fire control system, a thermal sight, and a modern communication system (Radmor RRC9310 radio, WB Electronics Fonet-IP communication system and Teldat battlefield management system). The vehicle was shown at a number of South American events including the SITDEF Peru 2009 Expo.

=== PT-72U / PT-91U / PT-91EU ===
(U for Urbanizowany – Tank to fight in urbanized terrain) A demonstrator for the MSPO 2011 military exhibition. This is an offer for the Polish Army which involves certain modifications of the T-72 and PT-91 tanks. The modification includes installation of such additional equipment as a remote-controlled cannon with an optical system, an omnidirectional observation system, add-on armour, and further engineering equipment. The PT-72U is equipped with a remote-controlled weapon station armed with a 12.7 mm machine gun mounted to the crew commander hatch. The system had a fire rotation of 360° and an elevation angle for the gun from -5° to 55°.

The observation system is equipped with 8 day–night cameras with the observation angle 55° and a rotary passive camera FLIR which has up to 26 times optical zoom. The armour package has chassis and turret bar armour. The bottom of the chassis is equipped with reactive armour and add-on armour. The PT-72U is equipped with a full range of new modern internal and external communication tools, allowing communication also via the internet. There were plans to modernize 84 Armenian T-72s to the PT-72U standard.

=== PT-16 ===
A further development introduced in 2016. Upgrades include improved armour, armament, and mobility. The hull armour and cast turret have been upgraded with add-on composite armour equivalent to up to 1000 mm RHA (rolled homogeneous armour), supplied by Germany. The protection can be improved with Polish ERAWA explosive reactive armour. The 125 mm smoothbore cannon has been replaced with a 120 mm smoothbore cannon compatible with NATO ammunition and uses a carousel-type autoloader. This autoloader is separate from the crew compartment, where the T-72 autoloader was located. The manned 12.7 mm machine gun has been upgraded to be remotely operated.

Other improvements include an upgraded fire control system. The tank is proposed to be fitted with a new engine, options for which include an unspecified Serbian turbocharged diesel, a German 1088 hp, Serbian V46-TK, and potentially yet-to-be-developed 1200 hp engines. Other improvements include rubber skirts covering the lower hull and the tracks, and new tracks based on those found on German Leopard 2s, which can be fitted with deep wading kits to allow it to ford water obstacles up to 13 feet (4.0 meters) deep. The upgrade can be applied to both PT-91s and T-72M1s, of which Poland has a total of 823 (233 PT-91s, 120 active T-72M1s, and 470 reserve T-72M1s). The vehicle did not enter mass production.

=== PT-17 ===
The main goals of the PT-17 tank were to increase firepower and fire maneuverability, increase mobility and survivability on the battlefield, improve crew comfort, and increase mission duration. The demonstrator was developed in cooperation with Ukrainian companies that supplied the tank turret. The PT-17's power range includes a S1000R ESM-350M engine and a reinforced suspension. Diehl rubber tracks are used. The chassis equipment includes an auxiliary power generator (APU), air conditioning, a new steering system with shuttlecock and a PCO KDN-1 Nyks day/night reversing camera.

The tank turret is a Ukrainian construction, featuring the Ukrainian KBM-2 smoothbore 120 mm cannon, with a barrel length of L50, and a 22 mm ammunition-charge unit mounted in the niche of the turret. The total ammunition capacity is 50 shells. The PT-17 was created with the experience of Ukrainian designers from UkrObronProm - the Oplot tank. Based on the Doublet reactive armor, the ERAWA-II reactive armor was created. He also took over the booking from him. According to statements by representatives from "Bumar-Łabędy", the armor of the tank is estimated at 1000mm of homogeneous armor. However, the turret's armor, as well as information about the latest reactive armor, have not been disclosed. The armament is supplemented by a 7.62 mm caliber machine gun and a remotely mounted ZSMU-1276 armament module manufactured by Zakłady Mechaniczne "Tarnów" S.A. The turret was equipped with stabilized sight-and-sight optics, GOC-1 Nike and GOD-1 Iris from PCO S.A. and BMS. Optionally, the manufacturer advises on the use of Safran's VIGY-15 panoramic day-observation device.

The additional composite armour of both the hull and the turret is expected to increase survival of the tank on the battlefield, as is the installed PCO SSP-1 OBRA-3 universal self-propelled vehicle system and two 6-tube intermittent grenade launchers.

=== PT-91M2 ===
Although the PT-91M2's modernization objectives are the same as the PT-17's, the range of the PT-91M2 differs considerably. The S-12U engine is powered by an 850-horsepower engine with enhanced mechanical transmission (Cx version). Tracks come with rubber overlays developed by Obrum / Bumar. Like the PT-17, reinforced suspension (torsion shafts, shock absorbers, and elastomer bumpers) are used. Among the chassis, equipment included the auxiliary power generator (APU), the modernized rotary car charger, the PNK-72 "Radomka" night-vision, and PCO KDN-1 Nyks night-time reversing camera. Hull protection is provided by the ERAWA III reactive armour and rod armour at the rear of the chassis.

Increased firepower is planned to be achieved by installing a 125 mm 2M46MS caliber Slovak cannon with a barrel length of 48 calibres. Inside the turret, there is also a change to the location of the second round of ammunition. Significantly, the PT-91M2 demonstrated a SAVAN-15 French fire control system (SAVAN-15) from Safran, previously used in PT-91M tanks in Malaysia. A TKN-3z night vision mount is available for the commander. The PT-91M2 has a SOD Observation System, a universal PCO SSP-1 OBRA-3 vehicle self-propelled system (both PCO S.A.), and two modules each of 12 902A smoke grenades. Additional protection for the turret includes ERAWA reactive armour modules.

== Related vehicles ==
=== WZT-3 ===
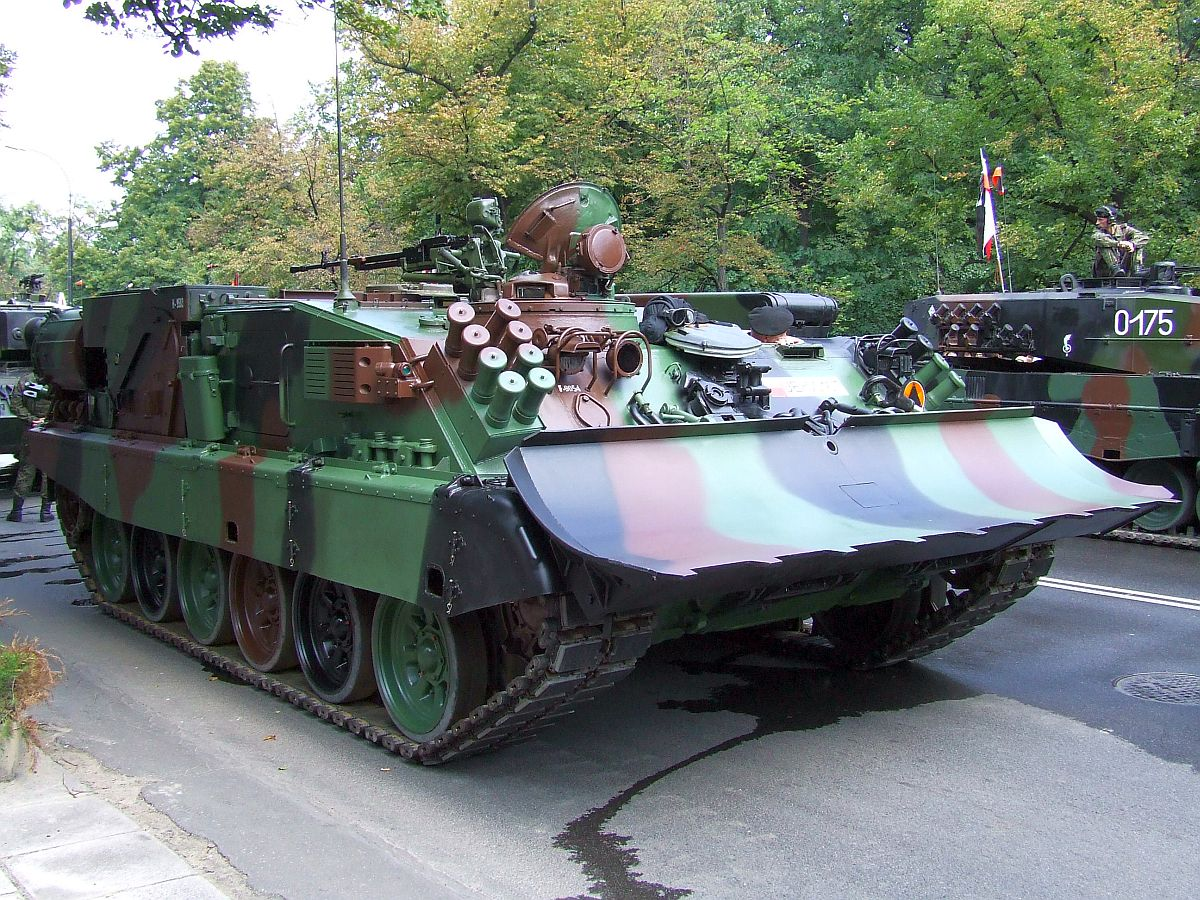
Polish Army WZT-3M

WZT is the acronym of for Wóz Zabezpieczenia Technicznego literally Technical Support Vehicle: it indicates a family of armoured recovery vehicles based on the PT-91/T-72 tank hull, with over 400 vehicles delivered to the clients. It is armed with a 12.7 mm (1/2 in) machine-gun fitted to the commander's hatch. Standard equipment includes: crane with telescopic jib that can lift a maximum load of fifteen tonnes, front-mounted stabilizing dozer blade, main and secondary winches.

- WZT-3 – A T-72 based variant for Polish Army – 20 vehicles.
- WZT-3M – A PT-91 based variant for Polish Army – 9 new vehicles and 20 WZT-3 upgraded to this standard.
- M-84AI – A M-84A based variant, made on licence in Yugoslavia – 15 vehicles for Kuwait
- ARV-3 – A T-72 based variant for Indian Army – 352 vehicles made
- WZT-4 – A PT-91M based variant for Malaysian Army (technically this vehicle is closely related to MID-M) – 6 vehicles

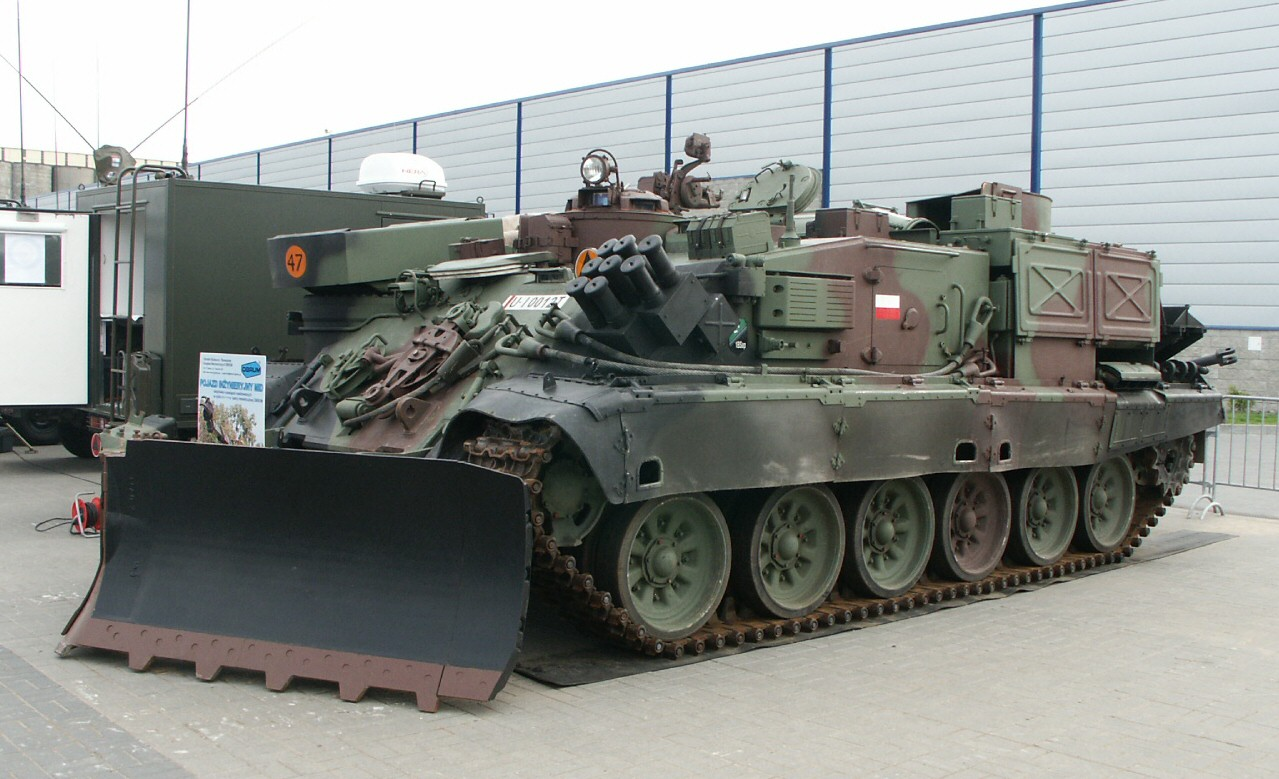
Polish Army MID

=== MID Bizon-S ===
(MID for Maszyna Inżynieryjno-Drogowa – lit. Engineering-Roading Machine; Bizon is Polish for Bison) – Polish engineering tank based on the PT-91 tank hull.

- MID – A PT-91 based variant for Polish Army – 8 vehicles
- MID-M – A PT-91M based variant for Malaysian Army – 3 vehicles

=== PMC ===
(PMC for Pomocniczy Most Czołgowy – lit. Auxiliary Tank Bridge) – Polish Armoured Vehicle Launched Bridge is a close-support bridgelayer. The PMC-90, developed on the basis of PT-91, is able to carry out missions required to operations of combat forces.

- PMC-90 – PT-91 based prototype vehicle with MLC-60 bridge. Not adopted.
- PMC-Leguan – PT-91M based variant for Malaysia equipped with the 26 m (87 ft) long MLC 60 Leguan bridge system. 5 vehicles for Malaysia.
- MG-20 Daglezja-G (MG for Most Gąsienicowy – lit. Tracked Bridge) – a tracked bridge system, based on a lengthened T-72 chassis with one additional road wheel, equipped with a MLC-70 bridge system. Closely related to a truck based MS-20 Daglezja. Currently in development phase, it is expected to replace a T-55 based BLG-67M bridges in Polish Army.

=== PZA Loara ===
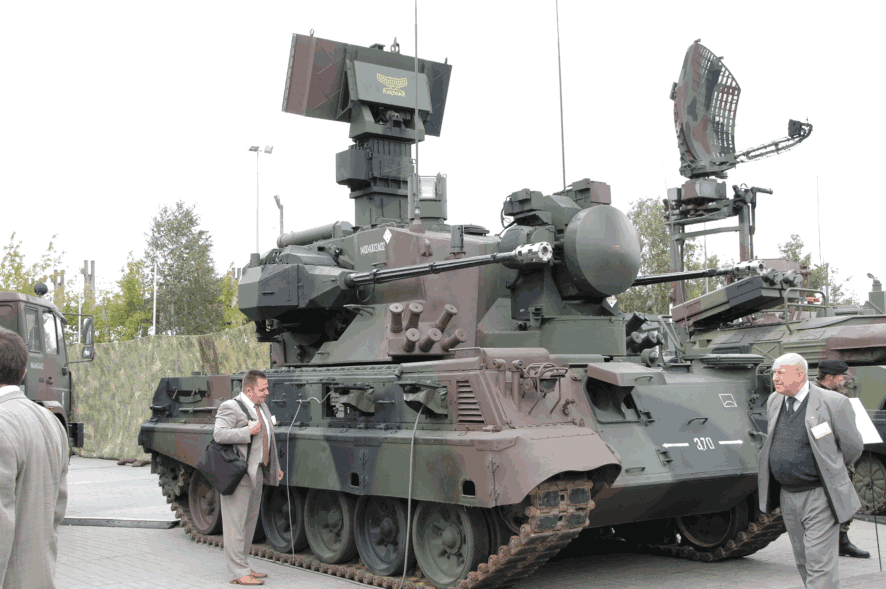
PZA Loara

The PZA (Przeciwlotniczy Zestaw Artyleryjski, meaning "AA Artillery System"; “Loara” means “Loire” in Polish) is an armoured self-propelled anti-aircraft artillery system developed in the late 1990s. Based around the Twardy chassis, this system mounts an armoured turret holding two Oerlikon KDA 35 mm cannons linked to a radar fire control system. It was planned that it would work closely together with PZR “Loara” (anti-aircraft rocket system) vehicles built on the basis of the PZA Loara but that project is currently on hold. The Loara is an autonomous fire unit capable of performing its tasks independently or acting as a component of a wider air defense system.

The system has two radars, 3D search radar and engagement radar. The search radar has a range of 26 km (16 mi) and is capable of tracking and identifying up to 64 targets at once. The radar system can be operated on the move, refreshing its data every second. The system has a laser range-finder, TV and FLIR cameras giving the system both all-weather day/night capabilities and the ability to operate entirely passively in a heavy ECM environment. The system has a reaction time less than 10 seconds. The system can engage aircraft flying at altitudes from very low altitudes up to 5,000 m (16,000 ft), and flying at speeds up to 500 m/s (1,125 mph). It is effective against infantry, lightly armoured ground and naval targets.

=== SJ-09 ===
SJ-09 is one of the elements of the T-72 and PT-91 crew training system. The system is composed of both trainers teaching crew trainees how to operate different systems of the tank and simulators allowing training more advanced situations. For example, the SJ-02 is used to teach how to load the main gun. The SJ-09 is the driver training vehicle used to train drivers in operating of the vehicle as big and heavy as main battle tank. The vehicle is a tank chassis that has the turret replaced with an instructor station. All unnecessary equipment (like side skirts) were removed. The vehicle has a dummy main gun that obstructs the driver's view, like in the real tank. Vehicles used by the Polish Army were rebuilt from the few original T-72 Ural in Polish inventory delivered from Soviet Union. Another vehicle was built new for the Malaysian Army as a part of the PT-91M order.

=== PT-94 Goryl ===
(Goryl is Polish for Gorilla) – project of a Polish main battle tank designed using experience gained on PT-91 project. The tank would be similar in its design to Merkava (engine at front), and it would feature redesigned engine, transmission and fire control system. Armour: composite + ERA, main armament: 120/125 mm gun, 60 mm mortar, secondary armament: 7.62 mm PKT coaxial machine gun, 12.7 mm NSWT AA machine gun, crew: 3. This program was also known under the name Anders. The program was cancelled at an early stage.

=== PT-97 Gepard ===
The Gepard (Polish for Cheetah), sometimes known as PT-2001, is another modification project of a Polish main battle tank prepared as a future modernisation programme for the T-72 family. The programme was called for, after the first PT-91 proposition fell below requirements. Two propositions were submitted, one by Bumar which provided a project with modified frontal armour, different mortar and sporting a Leclerc–like a turret with the 2A46 main gun. OBRUM's competing project had new front and sides reactive armour and a L-44 main gun.

Despite considerable improvements, neither was approved for financial reasons, and no prototypes were built. However, design experience helped with new PT-91 versions.

=== Krab ===
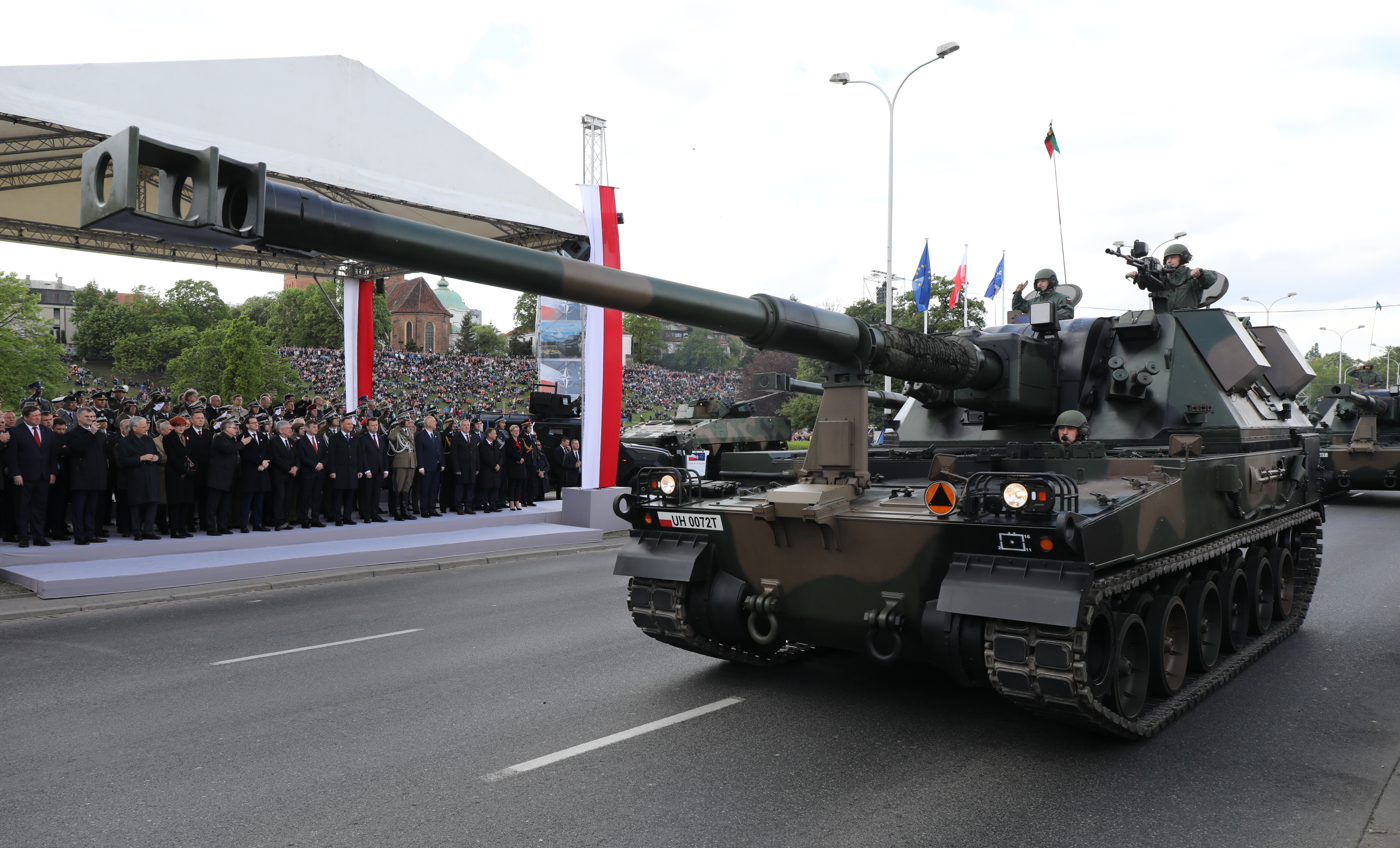
AHS Krab during a parade in Poland

The Krab (Polish for Crab) is a 155 mm self-propelled howitzer designed by HSW S.A. with an OBRUM's UPG-NG chassis (a heavily modified variant of the SPG-1M vehicle) which utilizes only a handful of components from the PT-91 program such as the road wheels, suspension and S-12U power plant. It combines these with a licensed AS-90M Braveheart turret armed with a 52-calibre gun and WB Electronics Artillery Fire Control System Topaz.

In 2014, this configuration was abandoned due to manufacturing flaws (microfractures detected in the vehicle's welded steel plates), numerous reliability concerns related to the automotive performance of the chassis and the loss of the Polish manufacturing line for the S-12U engine, and was replaced by the Korean-made K9 tracked chassis.

== Operational history ==
=== Poland ===
233 PT-91s were delivered between 1995 and 2002. 232 vehicles remain in service. An early prototype is preserved in the Land Forces Training Center museum in Poznań. 38 support vehicles were based on the T-72/PT-91 hull (29 WZT-3M armoured recovery vehicles, 8 MID engineering tanks, and one prototype PZA Loara self-propelled anti-aircraft weapon).

Number of PT-91s delivered to Polish Land Forces each year
1995–1996	1997	1998	1999	2000	2001	2002
58	58	7	33	50	20	7

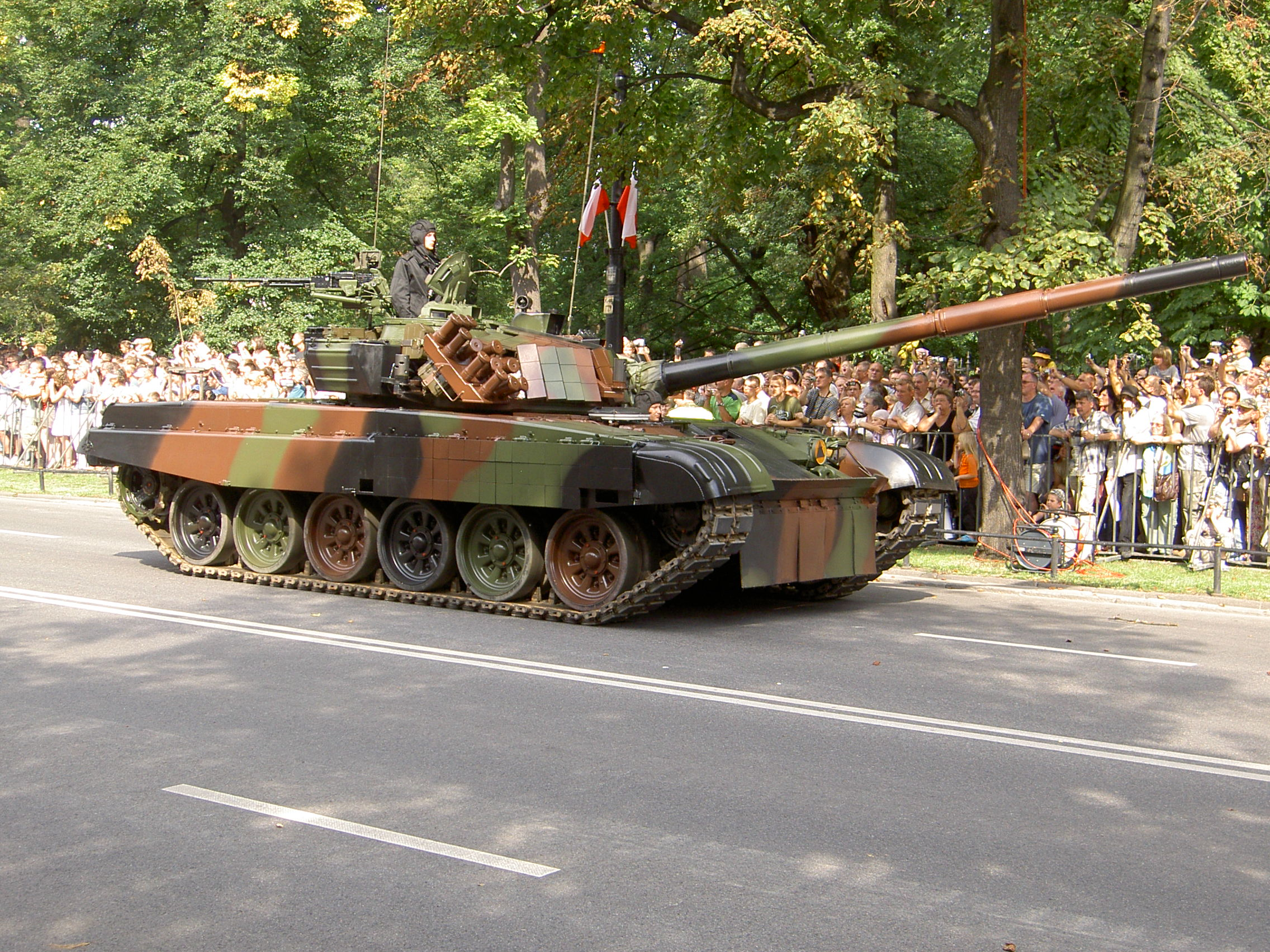
A PT-91 Twardy from the 1st Armoured Brigade on military parade in Warsaw

Units equipped with the PT-91 Twardy:

- 9 Brygada Kawalerii Pancernej (9th Armoured Cavalry Brigade) – two battalions, Braniewo - probably lost some tanks in 2022, relocated to units using T-72 that were transferred to Ukraine, it is expected that eventually 9th Brigade will receive K2 Black Panther like whole 16th Mechanized Division.
- 15 Brygada Zmechanizowana - operating one battalion of PT-91, same situation as with 9th Brigade.
- 19 Brygada Zmechanizowana - in 2022 received some PT-91s for training in place of T-72s transferred to Ukraine, eventually like whole 18th Mechanized Division it is expected to be equipped with M1 Abrams (expected since 2025).
- Centrum Szkolenia Wojsk Lądowych (Land Forces Training Center) – Poznań

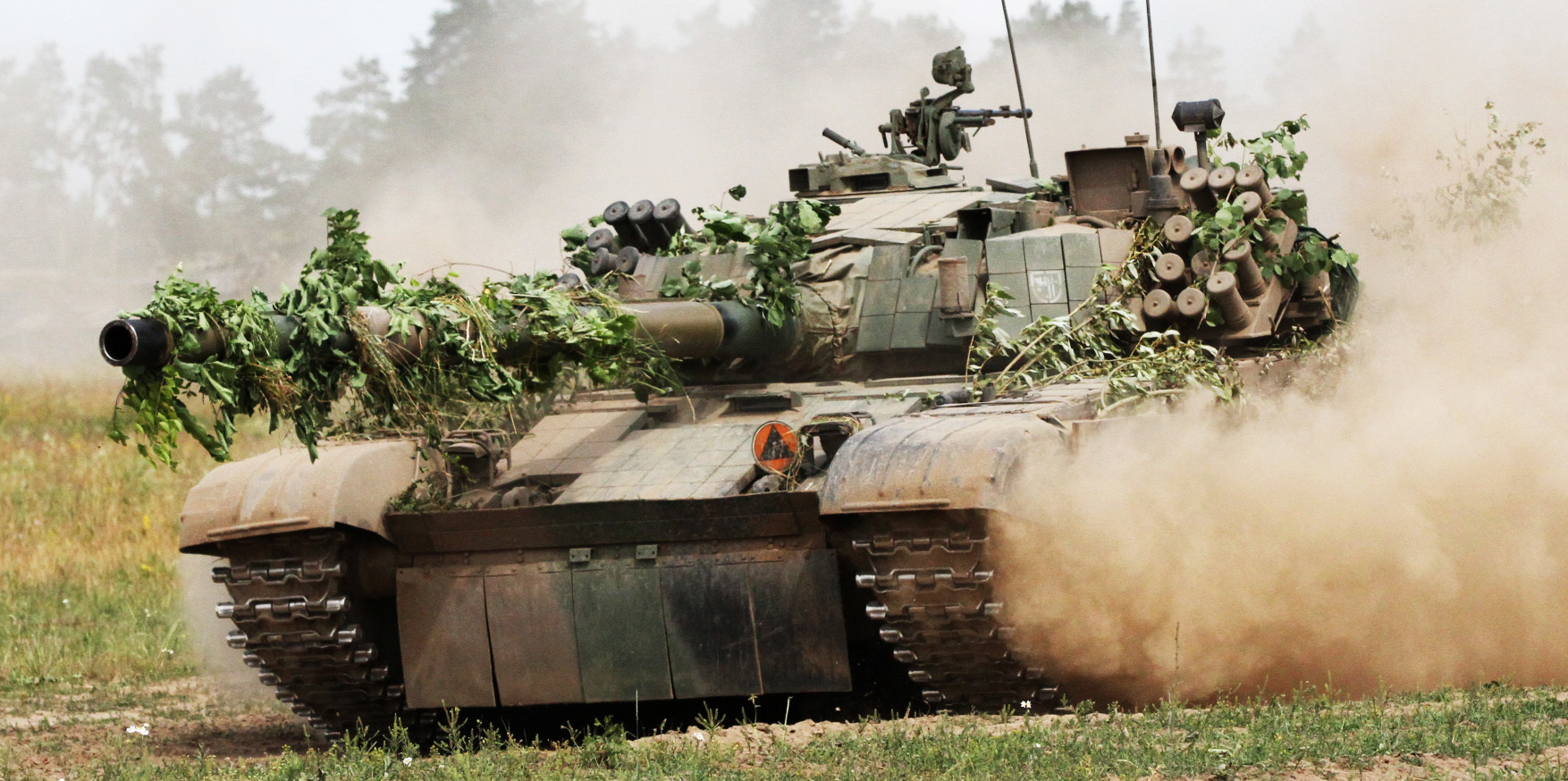
Polish PT-91 with ERAWA-2 ERA armour package during Saber Strike 18 training exercise held jointly with the United States Army.

Former units equipped with PT-91 Twardy:

- 1 Warszawska Brygada Pancerna (1st Armoured Brigade) Wesoła - one battalion, 2015 replaced with Leopard 2, since 2023 equipped with M1 Abrams like the rest of 18th Division
- 2 Brygada Zmechanizowana Legionów (2nd Mechanised Brigade) Złocieniec – In 2022 unit lost all its tanks, because most T-72s in service were transferred to Ukraine, as of 2023 tank battalion of 2nd Mechanized has no tanks.
- 10 Brygada Kawalerii Pancernej (10th Armoured Cavalry Brigade) – Świętoszów (replaced with Leopard 2A4 in 2002–03)
- 15 Wielkopolska Brygada Kawalerii Pancernej (15th Armoured Cavalry Brigade) – Wędrzyn (unit disbanded in June 2007)
- 17 Wielkopolska Brygada Zmechanizowana (17th Mechanized Brigade) – Międzyrzecz (replaced with KTO Rosomak)
- 34 Brygada Kawalerii Pancernej (34th Armoured Cavalry Brigade) – Żagań (replaced with Leopard 2A5 in 2014–15)

At the introduction of PT-91, the intention of Polish General Staff was to equip all brigades of the 11th Armoured Cavalry Division with the PT-91. At the time, the division had four brigades: the 10th Armoured Cavalry, 15th Armoured Cavalry, 17th Mechanised, and 34th Armoured Cavalry.

In 2002, the 10th Armoured Cavalry brigade received Leopard 2A4 tanks donated to Poland by Germany. In 2007, the 15th Armoured Cavalry brigade was disbanded and the 17th Mechanised received the first KTO Rosomak. All these changes allowed the reallocation of PT-91s to other divisions, replacing the oldest T-72s. In early 2014, the 34th Brigade from Żagań received the first Leopard 2A5 tanks, shifting its PT-91s to the 9th Brigade in Braniewo, which previously used the T-72M1.

A typical Polish PT-91 tank battalion is equipped with 58 tanks, composed of four frontline companies with 14 vehicles each, and 2 tanks for the battalion commander and the battalion second in command. Every company of 14 tanks is composed of three platoons, with 4 tanks in each and 2 tanks for the company commander and company's second in command.

Before the start of the war in Ukraine, Polish Land Forces operated 4 battalions of PT-91 tanks. 3 battalions in 16th Mechanized Division (2 in 9th Armored Cav brigade, 1 in 15th Mechanized Brigade) and one battalion in 12th Mechanized Division (2nd Mechanized Brigade). Since the start of the war in Ukraine, Poland transferred most combat ready T-72s and at least one battalion of PT-91 to Ukraine. 2nd Mechanized Brigade lost its PT-91 tanks in one tank battalion completely, 34th Armored Cavalry lost all (combat ready) T-72s from its two battalions with no replacement. 19th Mechanized Brigade also lost all T-72s from two battalions but received some PT-91s from 9th Armored Cavalry and 15th Mechanized (making all 3 units understrength). 20th Mechanized Brigade is another unit that lost all its T-72s from its one tank battalion, but already received first K2 Black Panther tanks (two companies as of late 2023), it will have two battalions of K2, including one newly formed.

It is planned that 16th Mechanized Division (with 9th Armored Cavalry, 15th and 20th Mechanized Brigades) will be equipped with K2 tanks (during transition a mix of K2 and PT-91). 18th Mechanized Division (with 1st Armored, 19th and 21st Mechanized Brigades) is receiving M1 Abrams tanks that will replace Leopard 2 and remains of T-72. It is expected 11th Armored Cavalry Division (with 10th and 34 Armored Cavalry and 17th Mechanized Brigades) will continue to operate Leopard 2 tanks that undergo upgrade to Leopard 2 PL variant (in 10th Brigade) and will receive more Leopard 2 tanks from 18th Division that will be replaced by M1 Abrams (for 34th Brigade).

=== Malaysia ===
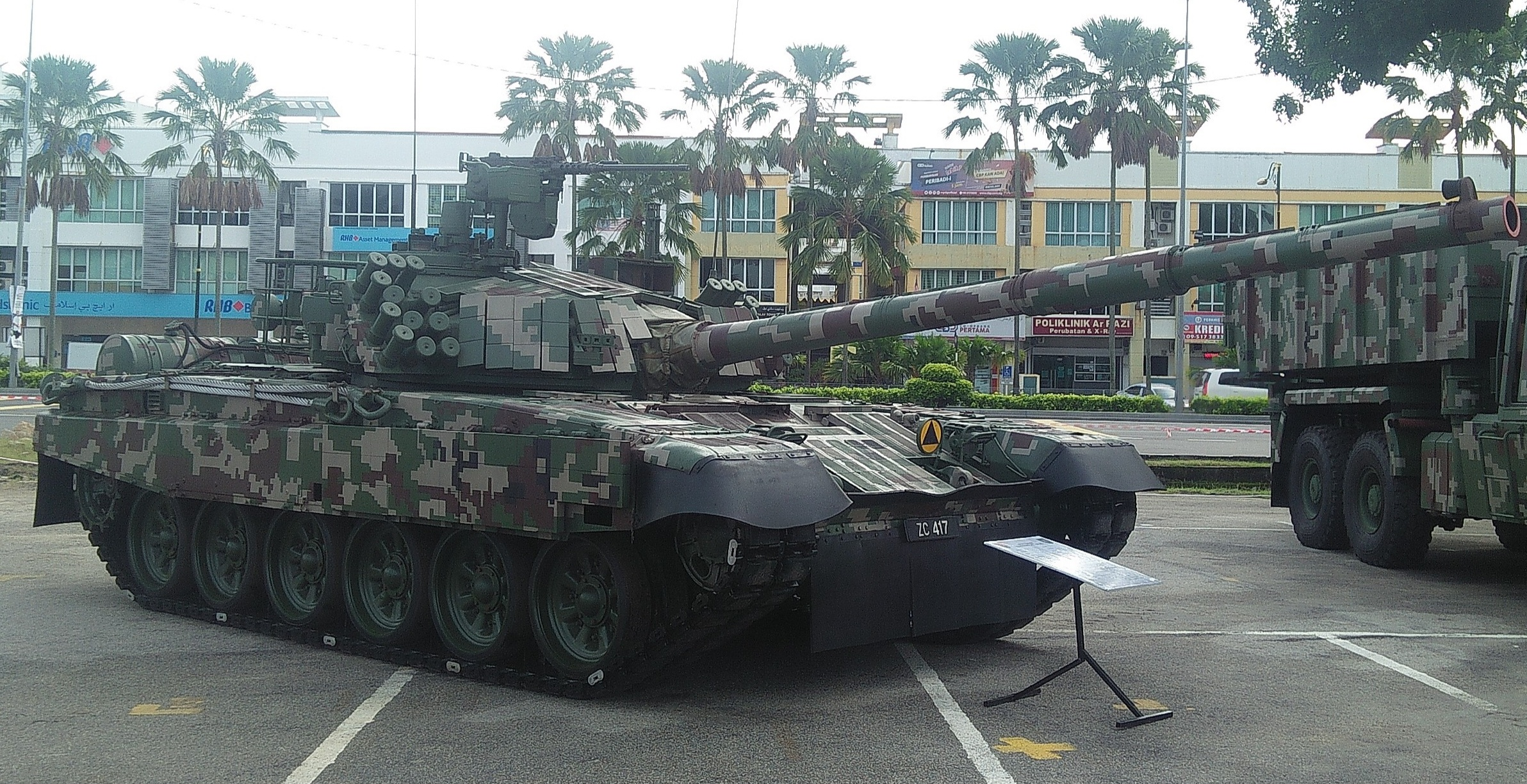
A PT-91M Pendekar of the Malaysian Army on display

In 2007–2009, Bumar Łabędy delivered to Malaysia 48 PT-91M and 15 support vehicles (6 WZT-4 {WZT-91M} armoured recovery vehicle, 3 MID-M {MID-91M} engineering tank, 5 PMC Leguan {PMC-91M} - armoured vehicle-launched bridge and one SJ-09 driver training tank), ammo, spares and support for US$370 million. Operating capability was reached 1 September 2010.

Units equipped with PT-91M:

- Rejimen ke-11 Kor Armour DiRaja – (11th Regiment of Royal Armoured Corps) – Gemas

Rejimen ke-11 KAD is the sole user of PT-91M in the Malaysian Army.

Number of PT-91M delivered to Malaysian Land Forces each year
2005	2006	2007	2008	2009
SP1 prototype for trials	SP2 prototype for trials	6	24	18 + 15 support vehicles

=== Georgia ===
Upgraded Georgian army T-72SIM-1 tanks use the Drawa-T fire control system, a development of the fire control system on the PT-91. The FCS is equipped with laser range finder and thermal imaging sensor. The system is slightly different from the one used on Polish PT-91s: the commander uses an LCD screen instead of an eyepiece. The Thermal Elbow Sight thermal imaging sensor used in Georgian tanks is of the same (Israeli) origin as the one used on the PT-91, though the external housing is different.

=== India ===
In April 1999, India ordered 44 WZT-3 armoured recovery vehicles, followed by orders in April 2002 (80 vehicles) and July 2005 (228 vehicles) for a total of 352 WZT-3s. These vehicles are used to support the T-72 and T-90 main battle tanks. Deliveries began in 2001, and India was planning to upgrade its Ajeya Mk1 tanks (local name for T-72M1) to Ajeya Mk2 standard, with some elements from PT-91, such as the Drawa-TE1 fire control system and the PZL-Wola S-1000 engine.

In October 2011, the Indian Defense Ministry announced that the state-owned BEML would produce an additional 204 WZT-3 armoured recovery vehicles – taking the total to 556 vehicles. The Ministry also clarified that no global tender was floated because it was a repeat order.

=== Ukraine ===
In April 2023, at least 30 PT-91s were sent to Ukraine by Poland for support in the 2023 Ukrainian counteroffensive. The tanks are used by 22nd Mechanized Brigade, new brigade of Ukrainian Land Forces trained and equipped by Poland.

As of the 6th of March 2026, the Oryx blog recorded the loss of 12 PT-91 tanks during the Russian invasion of Ukraine.

They were used by Ukraine during the August 2024 Kursk Oblast incursion.

== Operators ==
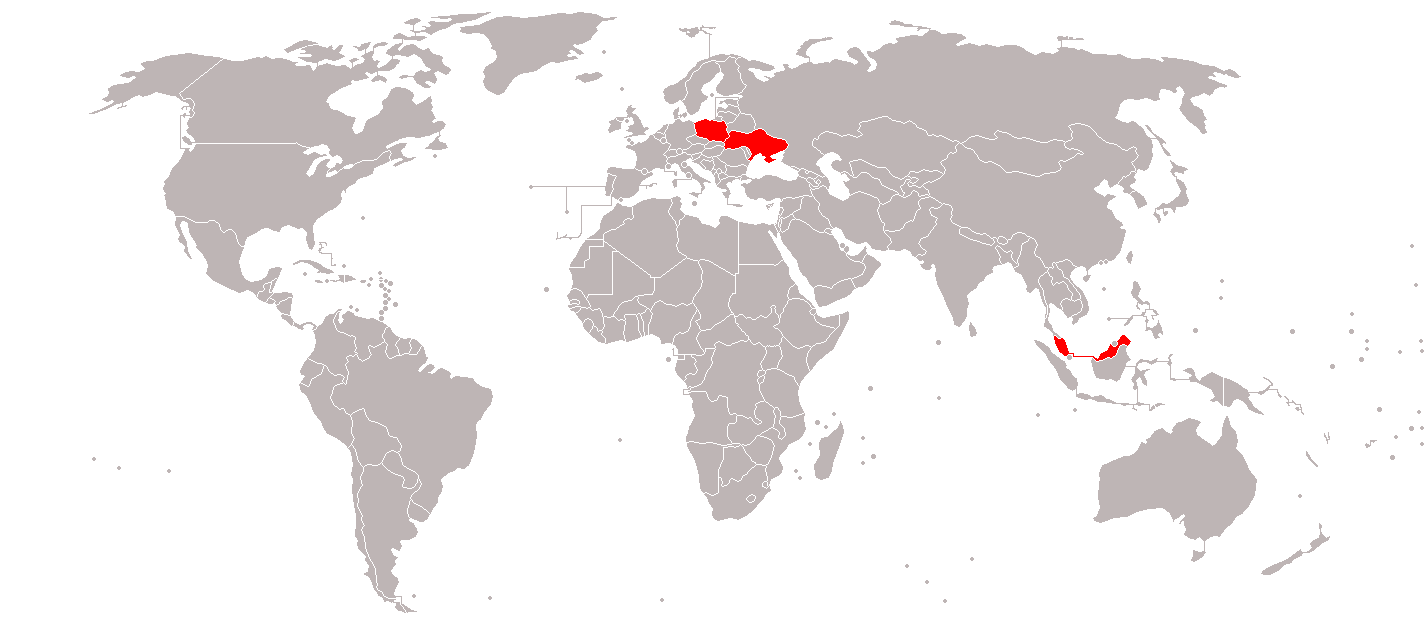
A map of PT-91 operators

=== Current operators ===
Poland

30 PT-91
24 PT-91MA
113 PT-91MA1

Malaysia
48 PT-91M Pendekar

Ukraine
60 PT-91U

=== Failed bids ===
Peru
The PT-91 was proposed to the Peruvian Army to replace its T-55s, but was not selected.
