= SPG Kalina =

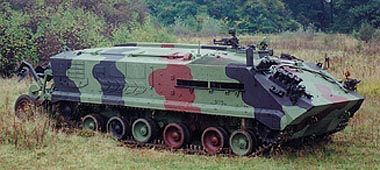
- SUM Kalina
- Type: Armored personnel carrier
- Place of origin: Poland

Service history
- Used by: Poland

Specifications
- Mass: around 30,000 kg
- Length: 10.41 m
- Width: 2.87 m
- Height: 3.35 m
- Main armament: 12.7mm NSVT machine-gun
- Engine: S12K diesel 780 hp
- Suspension: Torsion bar
- Maximum speed: 65 km/h

The SPG Kalina (Polish: Specjalne Podwozie Gąsiennicowe; SPG - lit. Special-purpose Tracked Chassis; Kalina is Polish for guelder rose) is a heavy, multi-purpose armoured personnel carrier designed at the OBRUM (OBRUM stands for Ośrodek Badawczo-Rozwojowy Urządzeń Mechanicznych – Polish for Research and Development Centre for Mechanical Appliances) and is produced by the Bumar Łabędy company - part of Polish military consortium - Bumar Group. SPG is a development of the joint Poland, Soviet Union and East Germany transporter called MT-S, developed in the late 1980s.

== Variants ==
=== N-21 ===
N-21 radar is a three-dimensional radar used to detect targets at low altitudes (up to 5 km) at ranges up to 100 km. The radar was designed by Polish company Radwar. Radar is using SPG-1, non armored carrier vehicle.

=== SUM Kalina ===
(SUM for Samobieżny Ustawiacz Min - lit. Self propelled Minelayer) is a tracked minelayer developed from SPG-1M specifically for the rapid laying of surface and buried anti-tank mines. The SUM minelayer has a crew of two. The minelaying system is carried at the rear of the vehicle with mines being automatically fed into the system from two magazines carried within the armoured superstructure; each magazine can hold up to 125 anti-tank mines of the TM-62M or TM-62M Wierzba type. The mine magazines are replenished or replaced using a K10 crane mounted at the rear of the vehicle which has a lifting capacity of 2,800 kg. The mine magazines can also be reloaded manually while the magazines are inside the vehicle. Supervision of the laying process can be carried out using a rear-mounted video camera connected to a monitoring screen inside the vehicle. The monitoring screen is located over a control panel used to control the minelaying operations. Provision is made for operations under NBC conditions by an air filtration system and a GO-27 or Polish-produced Tafios detection device. When burying mines the vehicle can travel at a speed between 6 and 10 km/h. When laying surface mines the speed range is from 6 to 20 km/h. It is possible to lay mines in water up to 900 mm deep at a speed of 6 km/h.The vehicle is armed with a 12.7 mm NSW machine gun; 902A smoke grenade launchers are also provided.

=== BWP-2000 ===
Infantry fighting vehicle based on SPG-1M. The hull of the vehicle is made entirely out of welded steel. It protects the vehicle against APFSDS-T projectiles of up to 35 mm in calibre over the frontal arc. The roof and sides protect it against 12.7 mm rounds fired from a range of 100 m. The other parts of the armour protect it against 7.62 mm rounds from any distance and angle. Both the hull and the turret can be fitted with additional passive of explosive reactive armour. The driver has a single-piece hatch cover that lifts and opens to the right (like in the BWP-1). In front of the driver's hatch is located a wide-angle periscope which can be replaced by a passive night vision device for use during night conditions. The power pack an air inlet/outlet louvres in the roof and the exhaust outlet on the right hand side. The turret is the Italian Oto Melara T60/70A which is normally armed with a stabilized 60 mm rifled autocannon, a 7.62 mm coaxial machine gun and 12.7 mm anti-aircraft heavy machine gun. Inside the turret are the stations of both the gunner and the commander. The 60 mm autocannon can be replaced by a variety of guns from 25 mm autocannons to 105 mm guns. The turret is equipped with two clusters of four electrically operated smoke grenade launchers on each side. The troop compartment can transport up to eight fully equipped soldiers. Like in the BWP-1 the troops enter and leave the vehicle through the rear of the vehicle but in BWP-2000 they do this via a power-operated ramp. Two prototypes were made and in 1997 one of them was fitted with a fully developed and tested Italian Oto Melara T60/70A turret. This turret was developed as a private venture by Oto Melara and it has remained in prototype stage. There are no plans for the Polish BWP-2000 IFV to enter production for the Polish Army.

=== Krab ===
A 155mm howitzer on UPG chassis. UPG (UPG for Uniwersalne Podwozie Gąsiennicowe – lit. Universal Tracked Chassis) is a heavy APC that is using technologies from SPG Kalina and PT-91 Twardy.
