= WZT =

WZT (Wóz Zabezpieczenia Technicznego – armoured recovery vehicle) was a Polish post-World War II armoured recovery vehicle series. It consists of five versions. The first two, WZT-1 and WZT-2 were built on T-55/T-55A hull, the WZT-3 was built on T-72M hull, the WZT-3M was built on PT-91 hull and the WZT-4 was built on PT-91M hull for Malaysia.

== WZT-1 ==
WZT-1
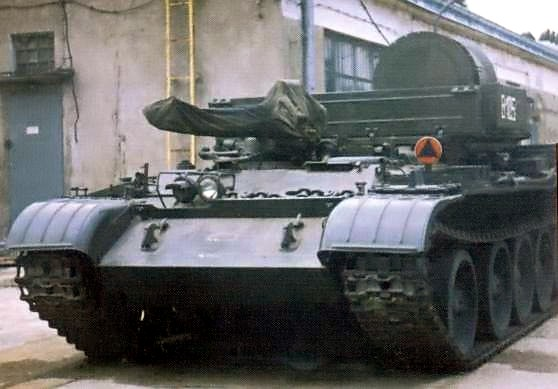
- WZT-1
- Place of origin: Polish People's Republic

Service history
- In service: from 1970 (out of service)

Production history
- Designed: late 1960s
- Manufacturer: Bumar-Łabędy
- Produced: 1970 –1978

Specifications
- Mass: 31.5 tonnes
- Length: 7.10 m
- Width: 3.27 m
- Height: 2.1 m
- Crew: 3
- Main armament: 12.7 mm DShK 1938/46 heavy machine gun (200 rounds)
- Engine: V-55A 12-cyl. 38.88 liter water-cooled diesel 580 hp (432 kW)
- Power/weight: 18.4 hp/tonne (13.7 kW/tonne)
- Suspension: torsion bar
- Operational range: 470 km
- Maximum speed: 50 km/h road, 27 km/h cross-country and 15 km/h towing

=== History ===
In the early 50s USSR started developing an ARV built on the hull of T-54 that was just entering production. A prototype vehicle was completed after a short while and was named BTS-1 (BTS - Bronirowannyj Tjagacz Sriednij). Production was launched and it became the basic ARV of the Soviet army. In 1955 BTS-1 was upgraded with a hoist and a small folding crane. This upgraded version was given the name BTS-2. It was built on the T-54 hull and later on the T-55 hull. In the end of the 60s Poland and Czechoslovakia bought the BTS-2. Basing on BTS-2 technical data the Zakład Produkcji Doświadczalnej Zakładów Mechanicznych "Bumar-Łabędy" (Experimental Production Institute of "Bumar-Łabędy") prepared a prototype of WZT-1 ARV. It was accepted into the Ludowe Wojsko Polskie and became its basic ARV replacing the older designs. Production started in 1970 in "Bumar-Łabędy" and continued until 1978 when it was completely replaced by WZT-2.

The WZT-1 were used in the upgrade of Newa SAM system to Newa-SC standard. The launcher was mounted on a WZT-1 chassis (many sources claim the vehicle to be T-55 tank but as a matter of fact vehicles never had tank turret in the first place). The upgrade replaced many analogue components with digital ones for improved reliability, accuracy, and mobility, and also adds IFF capability and data links. Unlike the original ARV variant the Newa launcher is still in use in the armed forces of Poland.

=== Operators ===
- Poland - former, some are used as chassis for Newa SC.

== WZT-2 ==
WZT-2
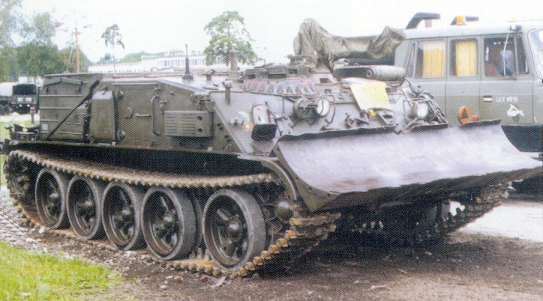
- WZT-2
- Type: Armoured recovery vehicle
- Place of origin: Polish People's Republic

Service history
- In service: 1973–present

Production history
- Produced: 1973–1992
- No. built: 600

Specifications
- Mass: 34 tonnes
- Length: 6.45 m
- Width: 3.27 m
- Height: 2.1 m
- Crew: 4 + 3 wounded
- Main armament: 12.7 mm DShK
- Engine: V-55W 12-cyl. 38.88 liter water-cooled diesel 591 hp (441 kW)
- Power/weight: 17.4 hp/tonne (13 kW/tonne)
- Suspension: torsion bar
- Operational range: 465 km

Polish ARV built on T-55 hull. It was built to perform repairs on T-55 and T-55A tanks. When it entered service in 1973 it was probably the best ARV in the Warsaw Pact. It is still able to carry out tasks that NATO gives ARVs of its class. Unlike the T-55 and the WZT-1, the WZT-2 is still the basic ARV of the Polish army used for field repairs. It can carry out repairs not only on Soviet tanks like the T-54/T-55 and T-72 but also on Polish PT-91 and German Leopard 2A4 tanks. However because all tanks currently in Polish service weigh more than 40 tonnes it is not able to tow them. It is used to tow lighter vehicles like BMP-1 and 2S1. A number of those vehicles are used by Ratownictwo Kolejowe (Railroad emergency response services).

=== Operators ===
- India - India bought 196 of those vehicles from Poland
- Iraq - most of them are scrapped in Gulf War
- Poland - a total number of 600 produced. 80 in service as of 2004. Some are used by Ratownictwo Kolejowe (Railroad emergency response services). Many have private owners who bought them from the Polish Army.
- Serbia - 16 in active service with Serbian Army, inherited unknown number of vehicles from Yugoslav Ground Forces.

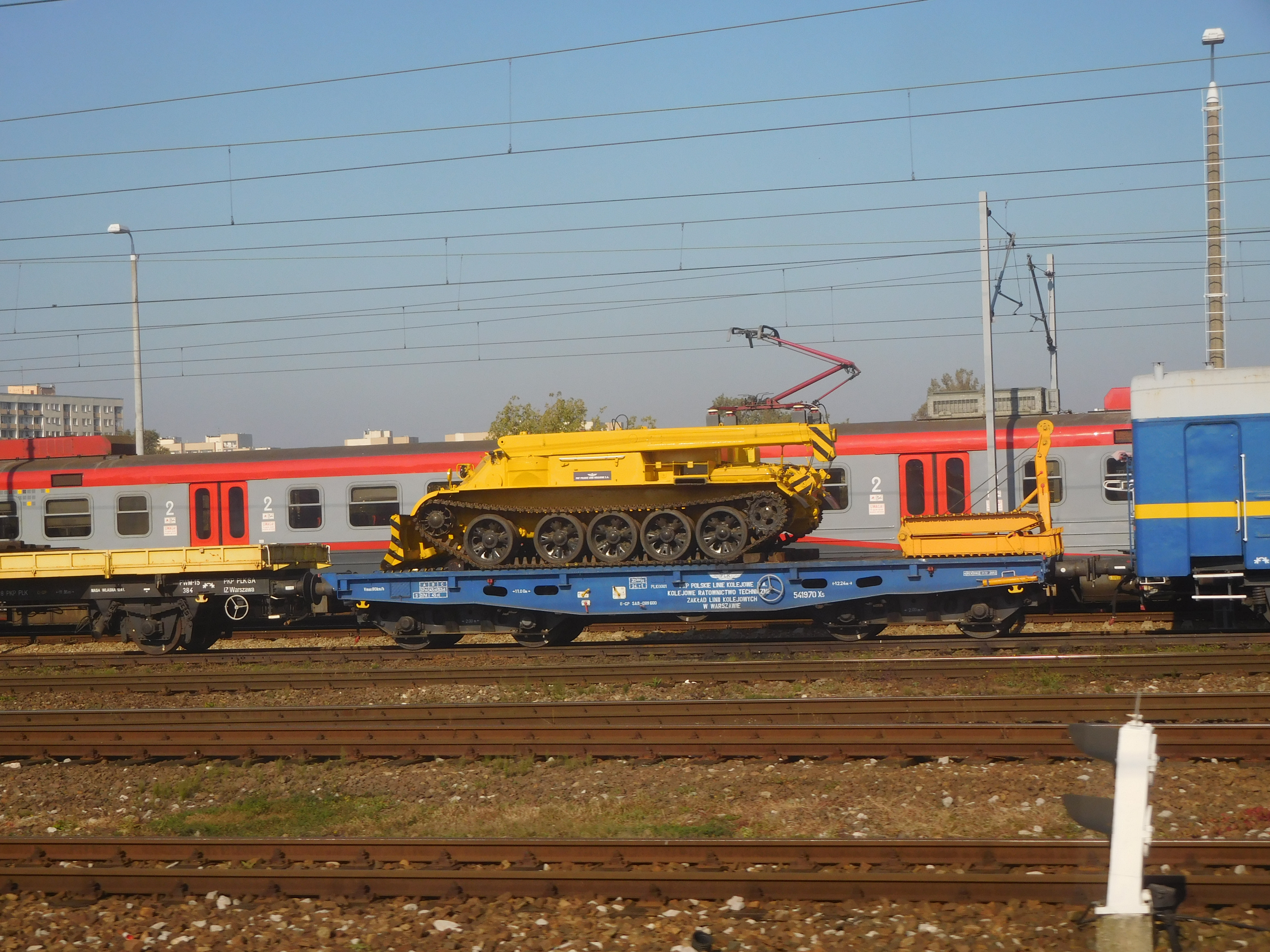
A WZT-2 used by the Polish Railways (2017)

== WZT-3 ==
WZT-3
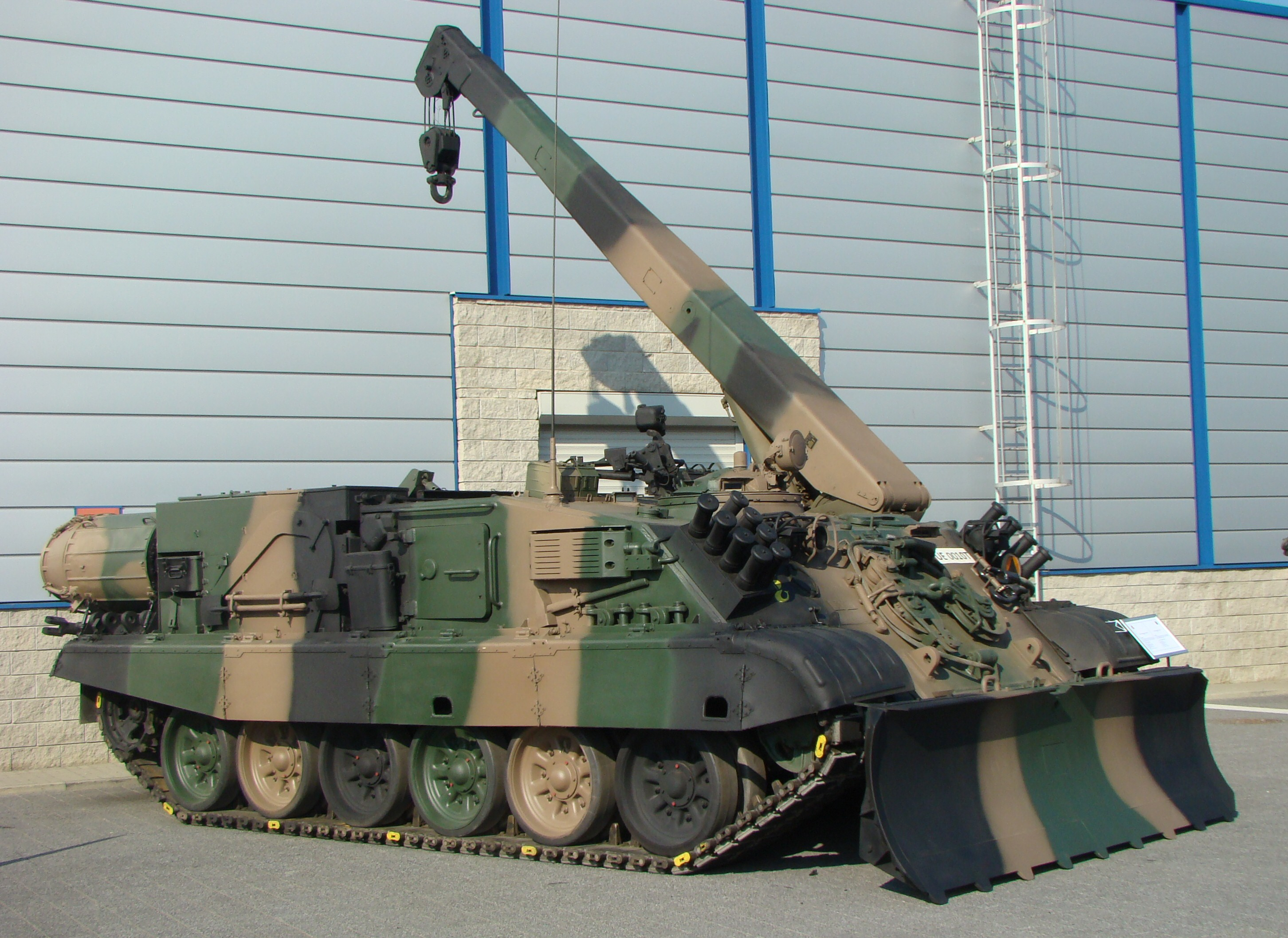
- Type: Armoured recovery vehicle
- Place of origin: Poland

Service history
- In service: 1989–?

Production history
- Produced: 1989–1999
- No. built: 40+

Specifications
- Mass: 42 tonnes
- Length: 8.30 m
- Width: 3.27 m
- Height: 2.71 m
- Crew: 4
- Main armament: 12.7mm NSW machine gun (200 rounds)
- Engine: V-46-6 12-cylinder diesel 780 hp (582 kW)
- Power/weight: 18.6 hp/tonne (13.8 kW/tonne)
- Suspension: torsion bar
- Operational range: 450 km
- Maximum speed: 60 km/h

=== History ===
When the T-72 entered service with LWP in 1978 a need for a new ARV appeared. It was decided that T-72M hull will be used. Wojskowy Instytut Techniki Pancernej i Samochodowej (Military Institute of Automobile and Armour Technology) from Sulejówek pointed out the main requirements of the vehicle and Ośrodek Badawczo-Rozwojowy Urządzeń Mechanicznych in Gliwice made two prototypes caring out the Bizon (Bison) program. Tests and trials were carried out from 1986 to 1988 and it was immediately accepted into the Polish Army. During a short production run 20 of those vehicles were made until 2003 when they were all upgraded to the WZT-3M standard.

=== Operators ===
- Croatia - unknown number, M-84AI version.
- Czech Republic - 8 sold in 2023.
- Kuwait - 15 (built by Yugoslavia under license in 90s as M-84AI)
- Poland - 20 (all modernized to WZT-3M standard)
- Serbia - unknown number, M-84AI version.

=== Former operators ===
- Yugoslavia - 25 licence built as M-84AI, 40 knock-down kits ordered in 1989, status unknown, possibly passed on Serbia and Croatia

== WZT-3M ==
WZT-3M
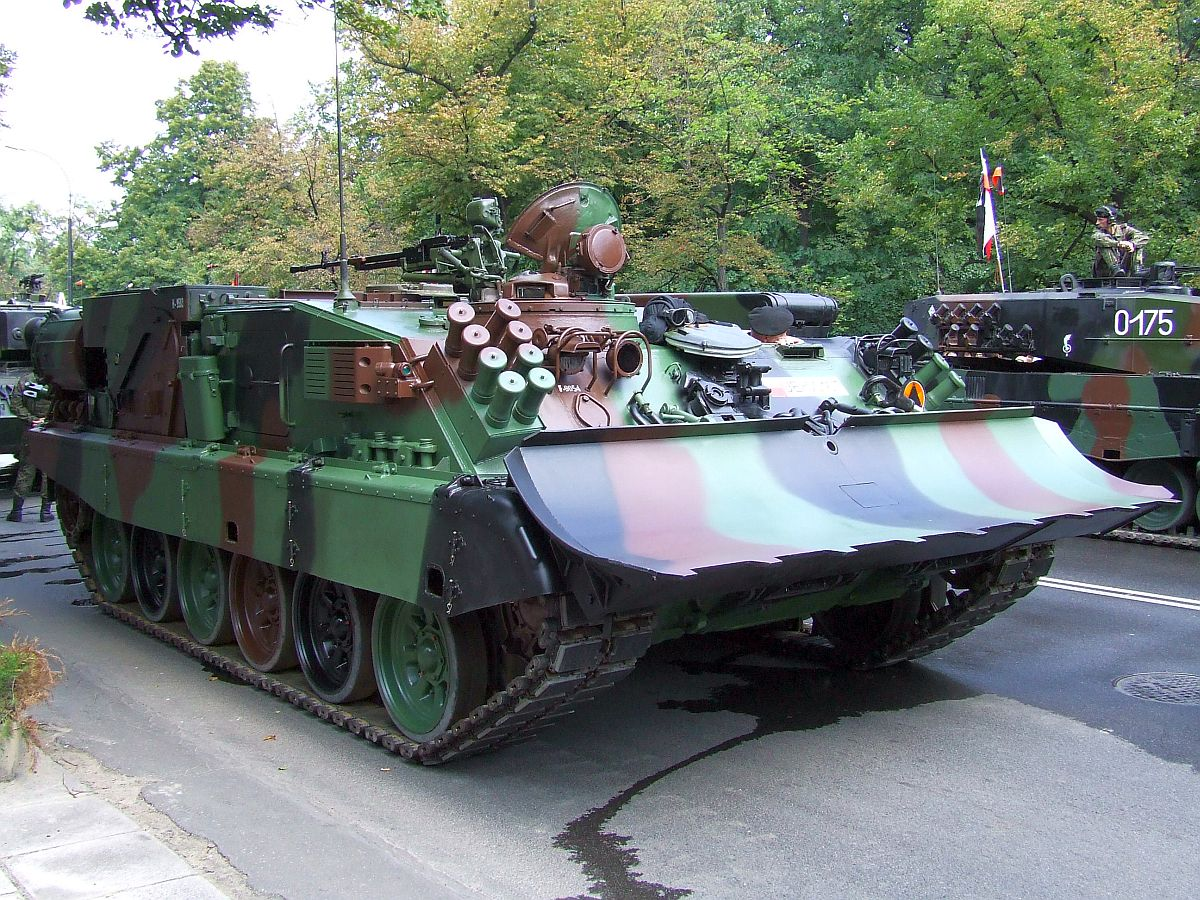
- WZT-3M on a military parade in Warsaw, 15.08.2007.
- Type: Armoured recovery vehicle
- Place of origin: Poland

Service history
- In service: 1999–present

Production history
- Produced: 1999–present
- No. built: 9 + 20 upgraded WZT-3 for Polish Army and 352 built for Indian Army

Specifications
- Mass: 42 tonnes
- Length: 8.30 m
- Width: 3.27 m
- Height: 2.71 m
- Crew: 4
- Armor: PT-91 armour
- Main armament: 12.7mm NSW
- Engine: PZL-Wola S12U 4-cyl. 38.9 liter diesel 850 hp (634 kW)
- Power/weight: 20.2 hp/tonne (15.1 kW/tonne)
- Suspension: torsion bar
- Operational range: 650 km road, 600 km cross-country
- Maximum speed: 60 km/h

=== History ===
When PT-91 entered service in Polish army it was decided that the WZT-3 which was based on T-72M should be upgraded with elements from PT-91. The upgraded variant was given WZT-3M designation. The main difference was the engine. The original WZT-3 had a 780 hp (582 kW) 12-cyl. diesel engine from T-72M. The WZT-3M has an 850 hp (634 kW) PZL-Wola S12U 12-cyl. 38.9 litre diesel from PT-91. During initial production run 9 vehicles were made before 2003 when 20 of the old WZT-3 were upgraded to the WZT-3M standard.

=== Operators ===
- India - 556 WZT-3M (In April 1999, India ordered 44 WZT-3M armored recovery vehicles; this order was followed by another two orders in April 2002 (another 80 vehicles) and in July 2005 (228 vehicles). Vehicles are used to support units equipped with T-72 and T-90 MBT. Deliveries began in 2001. In 2011 India placed follow-on order for additional 204 ARVs, vehicles are produced under licence by BEML Ltd using Polish components. That gives the total number of 556 WZT-3M ARV ordered by Indian Army).
- Malaysia - 6 WZT-4 (upgraded WZT based on PT-91M)
- Poland - 29 WZT-3M (20 WZT-3 are modernized to WZT-3M standard)
