= Timeline of the Polish Army =

== 1569–1699 ==
- Silver Age of The Republic
  - September 8, 1581 - Siege of Psków - Polish–Lithuanian Commonwealth - Russia
  - October 19, 1595 - Battle of Cecora - Polish–Lithuanian Commonwealth - Turkey
  - September 27, 1605 - Battle of Kircholm - Polish–Lithuanian Commonwealth - Sweden
  - July 4, 1610 - Battle of Kłuszyn - Polish–Lithuanian Commonwealth - Russia & Sweden - after this battle Poland conquered Moscow.
  - September 1, 1612 - Battle of Moscow - Polish–Lithuanian Commonwealth - Russia
  - September 20, 1620 - Battle of Cecora - Polish–Lithuanian Commonwealth - Turkey
  - September 2, 1621 - Battle of Chocim - Polish–Lithuanian Commonwealth - Turkey
  - November 28, 1627 - Battle of Oliwa - Polish–Lithuanian Commonwealth - Sweden
  - July 10 - August 22, 1649 - Defense of Zbaraż - Polish–Lithuanian Commonwealth - Cossacks & Crimea
  - June 28, 1651 - Battle of Beresteczko - Polish–Lithuanian Commonwealth - Cossacks
  - January 29, 1655 - Battle of Ochamatów - Polish–Lithuanian Commonwealth - Russia
  - November 18, 1655 - Defense of Jasna Góra - Polish–Lithuanian Commonwealth - Sweden
  - July 20, 1657 - Battle of Czarny Ostrów - Polish–Lithuanian Commonwealth - Sweden
  - November 11, 1673 - Battle of Chocim - Polish–Lithuanian Commonwealth - Turkey
  - September 12, 1683 - Battle of Vienna - Polish–Lithuanian Commonwealth - Turkey - One of the most important battles in Europe

== 1700–1795 ==
- Fall of the Republic
  - February 29, 1768 - Confederation of Bar is formed.
  - July 27, 1768 - The Siege of Kraków begins.
  - 1770 - The Battle of Dobra takes place.
  - May 21, 1771 - The Battle of Lanckorona takes place.
  - September 6 - The Battle of Antopol takes place.
  - 1792 - The War in Defense of the Constitution begins.
  - The Battle of Mir takes place.
  - The Battle of Zelwa takes place.
  - June 18 - The Battle of Zielenice takes place.
  - July 18 - The Battle of Dubienka takes place.
  - April 2 - The Battle of Racławice takes place.
  - The Warsaw Uprising takes place.
  - The Wilno Uprising takes place.
  - June 6 - The Battle of Szczekociny takes place.
  - June 8 - The Battle of Chelmno takes place.
  - October 10 - The Battle of Maciejowice takes place.
  - November 4 - Massacre of Praga takes place.

== 1795–1914 ==
- Age of Partition

1807–1815 - Duchy of Warsaw: puppet state in ally with the First French Empire: various Polish formations fighting within the French army, the Duchy's forces took part in the invasion on the Russian state: Battle of Borodino, Battle of Berezina;
1815–1830 - the puppet Polish Kingdom, ruled by tsars (kings of Poland), with some autonomy, especially separate armed forces, which fought in the Polish-Russian War 1830–1831, largely known as the November Uprising; after the war the Kingdom became officially part of the Russian Empire, hence all Polish forces were disbanded.
The Polish under the rule of Berlin and Vienna had no military formations of their own until World War I.

== 1914–1922 ==
- Age of regaining independence
  - 1914–1918 - First World War
  - 1918 - Greater Poland Uprising
  - 1919 - First Silesian Uprising
  - 1919 - Sejny Uprising - should have been a part of secret services staged coup against Lithuanian government
  - 1919–1920 - Polish-Soviet War
  - 1920 - Second Silesian Uprising
  - 1921 - Third Silesian Uprising

== 1923–1948 ==
- Age of the Second Republic
  - World War II

== 1948–present ==
- Present age
  - 2003–present Iraq War
  - Afghanistan War
