= TELDAT =

- Native name: TELDAT SPÓŁKA Z OGRANICZONĄ ODPOWIEDZIALNOŚCIĄ SPÓŁKA KOMANDYTOWA
- Romanized name: TELDAT LIMITED LIABILITY COMPANY LIMITED PARTNERSHIP
- Industry: Arms industry
- Founded: 1997
- Headquarters: Bydgoszcz, Poland

TELDAT is a Polish company established in 1997, headquartered in Bydgoszcz. It operates in the arms industry with a focus on electronics, information technology, and telecommunications. The company is actively involved in research and development in the fields of information technology and electronics. TELDAT specializes in designing and manufacturing data communications systems, computers, software, and data transmission devices, particularly for military applications.

TELDAT's products and provided services are used, among others, in: most military units and institutions of the Poland Ministry of National Defense including on foreign operations of the Polish Armed Forces, such as in: PKW Afghanistan, PKW in the Central African Republic, PKW Congo, PKW Chad, PKW Orlik, in the Baltic countries and PKW Kosovo. TELDAT systems have been used and tested in successive editions of major military exercises in the country and abroad, such as: Combined Endeavor, NATO CWID, NATO CWIX and Bold Quest, organized by the Polish Armed Forces, NATO and the US Armed Forces. TELDAT systems have been used and tested in successive editions of major military exercises in the country and abroad, such as: Combined Endeavor, NATO CWID, NATO CWIX and Bold Quest, organized by the Polish Armed Forces, NATO and the US Armed Forces.

The creator, president of the company and author of the technical solutions implemented in it was Dr. Eng. Henryk Kruszyński. He developed all the ICT systems produced by the company to support command, communications and military operations.
