= Bumar-Łabędy =

Polish defence company

- Native name: Zakłady Mechaniczne „Bumar-Łabędy”
- Type: State-owned
- Industry: Defense
- Founded: 1951
- Headquarters: Gliwice, Poland
- Revenue: US$820,000,000 (2012)
- Number of employees: 1250
- Website: https://bumar.gliwice.pl/

Bumar-Łabędy is a Polish manufacturer of military vehicles and construction equipment, based in Gliwice, Upper Silesia. It is a division of the Polish Armaments Group.

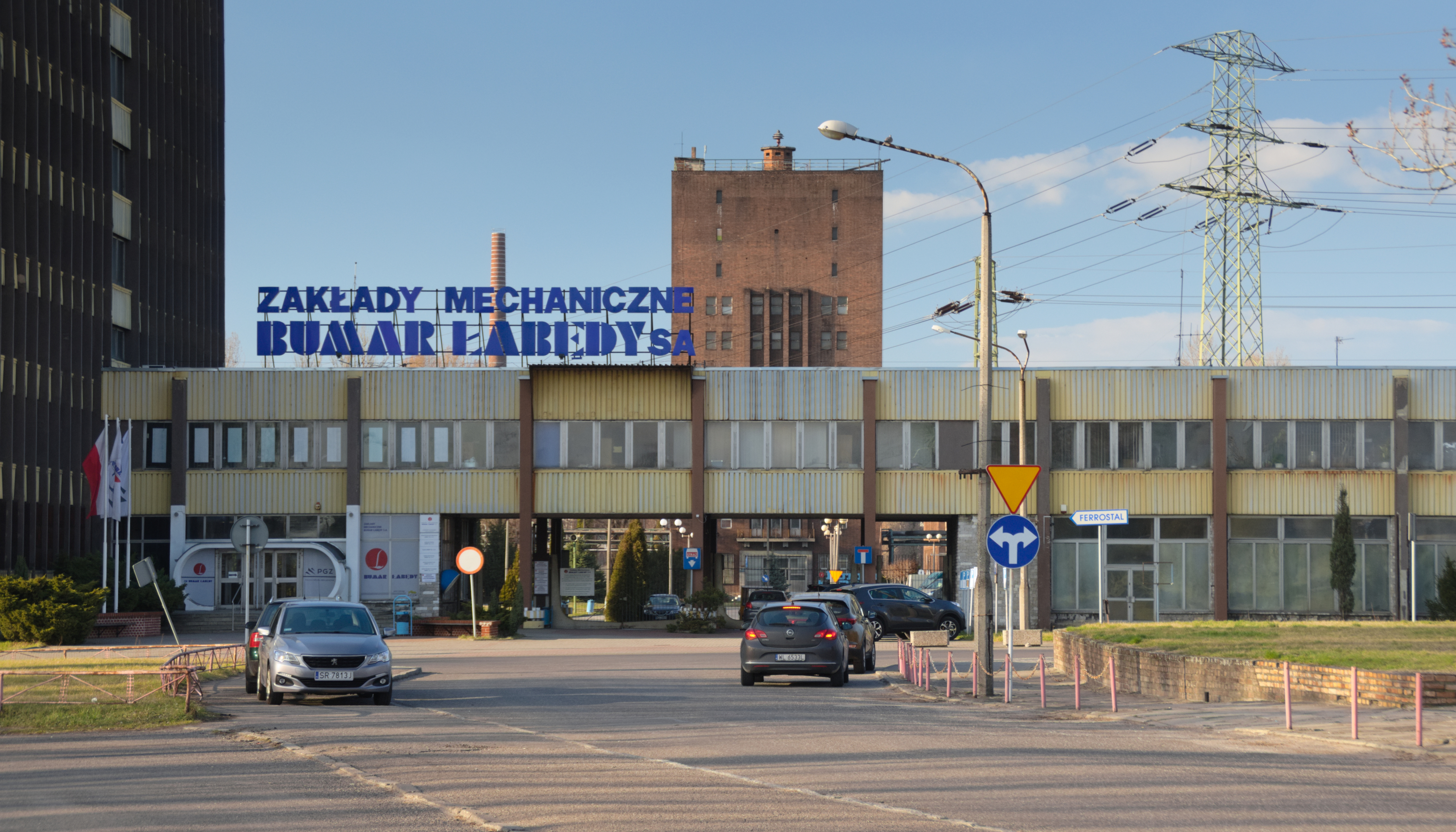
Bumar Łabędy buildings (2019)

== History ==
Zakłady Mechaniczne "BUMAR-ŁABĘDY" S.A. based in Gliwice are one of the companies belonging to Polska Grupa Zbrojeniowa S.A. They are an entity classified as an enterprise of strategic importance for the country's defense. The company specializes in the production, renovation and modernization of armored equipment.

In 2010 the firm won the contract to build Hitfist OWS remote-controlled turrets for Polish armored vehicles.

In 2016 the firm was awarded the contract to refit Poland's Leopard 2 tanks.

In 2017 the firm was contracted to refit Poland's T-72 tanks.
