= WB Electronics FT5-Łoś =

- Type: Unmanned aerial vehicle
- Place of origin: Poland

Service history
- Used by: Polish Land Forces

Production history
- Designer: WB Group
- Manufacturer: WB Group
- No. built: 20

Specifications
- Mass: 85 kg in starting position 55 kg in air
- Length: 3,1 m
- Passengers: 0
- Maximum firing range: 300 km (with moving ground station)

WB Electronics FT5-Łoś – WB Electronics FT5-Łoś – an unmanned aerial vehicle (UAV) developed by the Polish company WB Electronics, intended for close reconnaissance (short range) and as a weapon carrier.

== Development ==
The FT5-ŁOŚ was developed for the short-range tactical UAV “Orlik” program for the Polish Army.

== Orders ==
Artillery reconnaissance variant was ordered as a part of Gladius programme.

== Operators ==
Poland

== See also ==
- WB Electronics Warmate
- WB Electronics FlyEye

== Bibliography ==
- "BSP FT5-ŁOŚ". Grupa WB (in Polish).
- "Łoś – uzbrojony dron z Polski [Defence24.pl TV]". Defence24.pl (in Polish).
