= Georgian Air Force =

Air warfare branch of Georgia's defense forces

Aviation and Air Defense Command
- თავდაცვის ძალების ავიაციისა და საჰაერო თავდაცვის სარდლობა; tavdatsvis dzalebis aviatsiisa da sahaero tavdatsvis sardloba
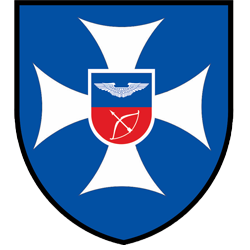
- Georgian Air Force emblem
- Founded: 1992; 34 years ago (as Georgian Air Force)
- Country: Georgia
- Type: Air force
- Role: Aerial warfare
- Size: 2,971 personnel; 70 aircraft
- Part of: Georgian Defence Forces
- Headquarters: Alekseevka, Tbilisi
- Anniversaries: 19 September
- Engagements: Georgian Civil War; War in Abkhazia; Russo-Georgian War
- Website: MOD Website in georgian

Commanders
- Commander-in-Chief: President Mikheil Kavelashvili
- Prime Minister: Irakli Kobakhidze
- Minister of Defense: Irakli Chikovani
- Chief of Defense Forces: Maj. Gen. Giorgi Matiashvili
- Commander: Colonel Sergo Ninua

Insignia
- Roundel

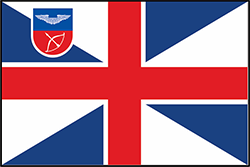
- Flag

Aircraft flown
- Attack: Su-25
- Helicopter: Mi-8/171, Mi-14, Mi-24, UH-1H
- Reconnaissance: Elbit Hermes 450, WB Electronics Warmate, WB Electronics FlyEye, Aerostar
- Trainer: L-39
- Transport: An-2, An-28

The Aviation and Air Defence Command of the Defence Forces (Georgian: თავდაცვის ძალების ავიაციისა და საჰაერო თავდაცვის სარდლობა, romanized: tavdatsvis dzalebis aviatsiisa da sahaero tavdatsvis sardloba), formerly Georgian Air Force (Georgian: საქართველოს საჰაერო ძალები, sak’art’velos sahaero dzalebi), is the air force of the Defense Forces of Georgia. It was established as part of the Georgian Armed Forces in 1992 and merged into Army Air Section in 2010. As part of reforms in the Georgian military, the Air Force was reestablished as a separate command of the Defense Forces in 2016.

== History ==
=== Founding and abolition ===
The Georgian Air Force and Air Defense Division was established on January 1, 1992. On August 18, 1998, the two divisions were unified in a joint command structure and renamed the Georgian Air Force.

The first combat flight was conducted by Izani Tsertsvadze and Valeri Nakopia on September 19, 1992, during the separatist war in Abkhazia. This date was later designated as the Georgian Air Force Day.

In 2010, the Georgian Air Force was abolished as a separate branch and incorporated into the Georgian Land Forces as Air and Air Defense sections.

=== Reestablishment and modernization ===
The Georgian Air Force was formally re-established in 2016 but all fixed wing aircraft were left abandoned till 2020. Under the leadership of Georgian Minister of Defense Irakli Garibashvili the Air Force was re-prioritized and aircraft owned by the Georgian Air Force are being modernized and re-serviced after they were left abandoned for 4 years. The Minister of Defense also announced plans to acquire strike drones to increase Georgia's combat readiness.

== Ranks ==
=== Commissioned officer ranks ===
The rank insignia of commissioned officers.

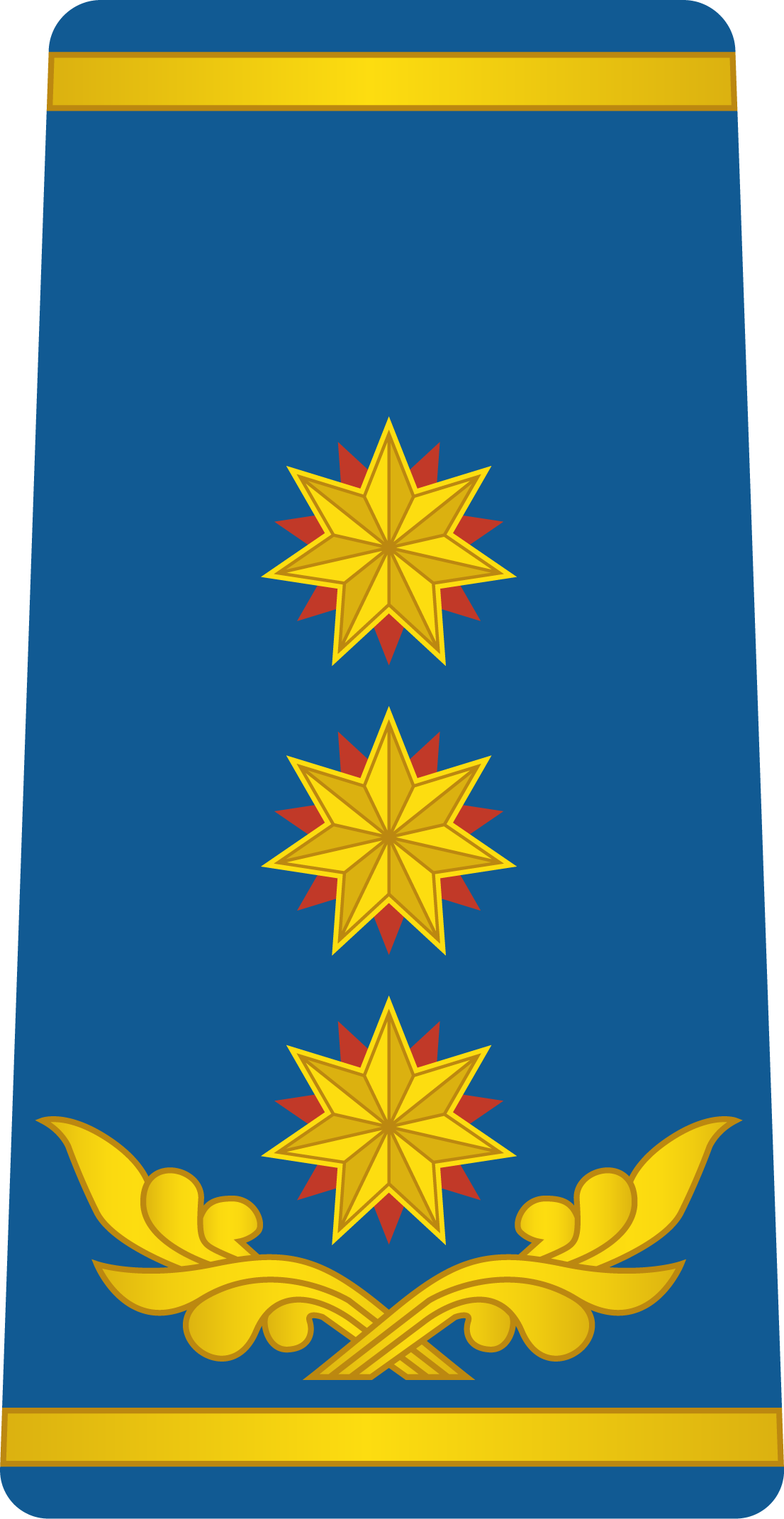
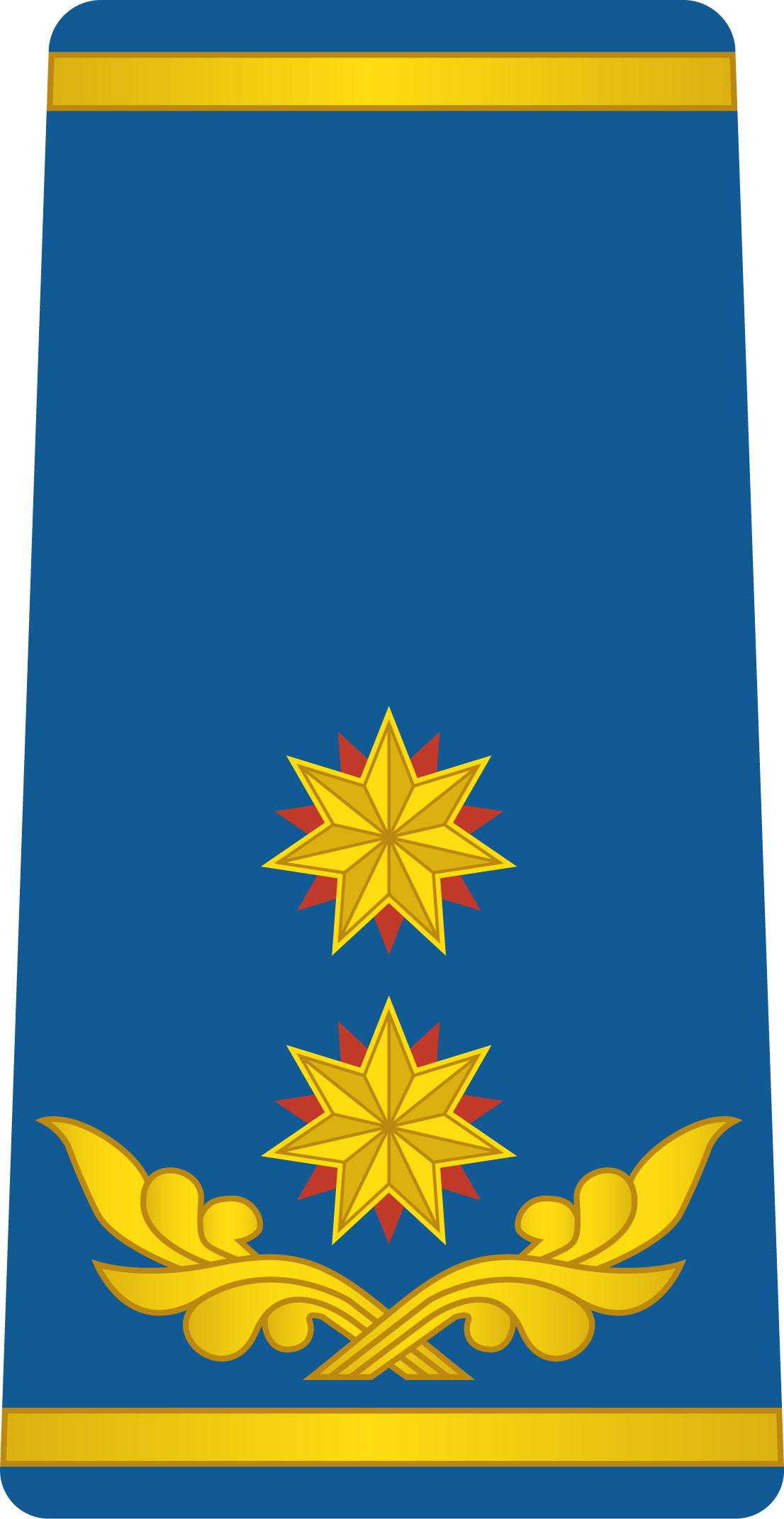
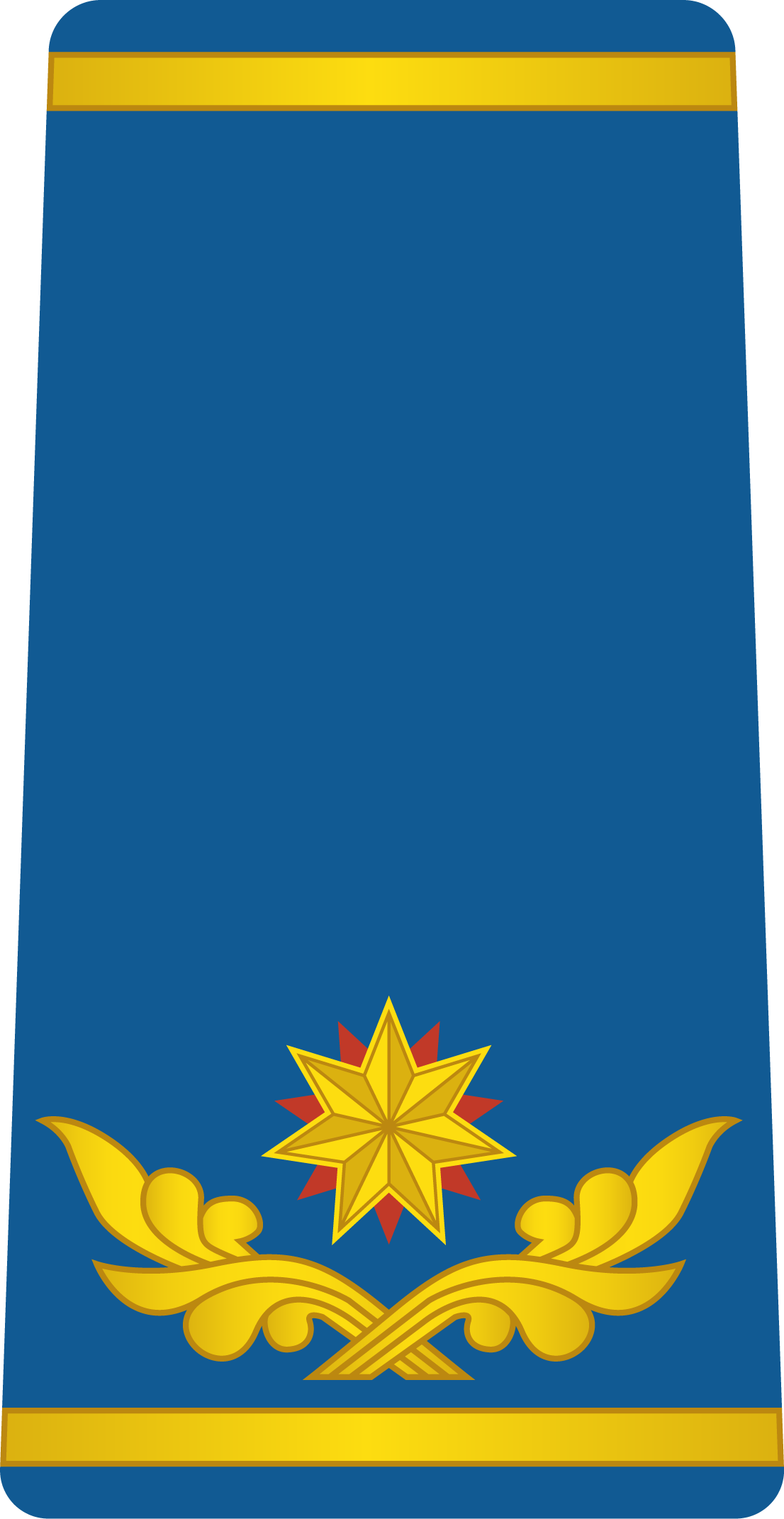
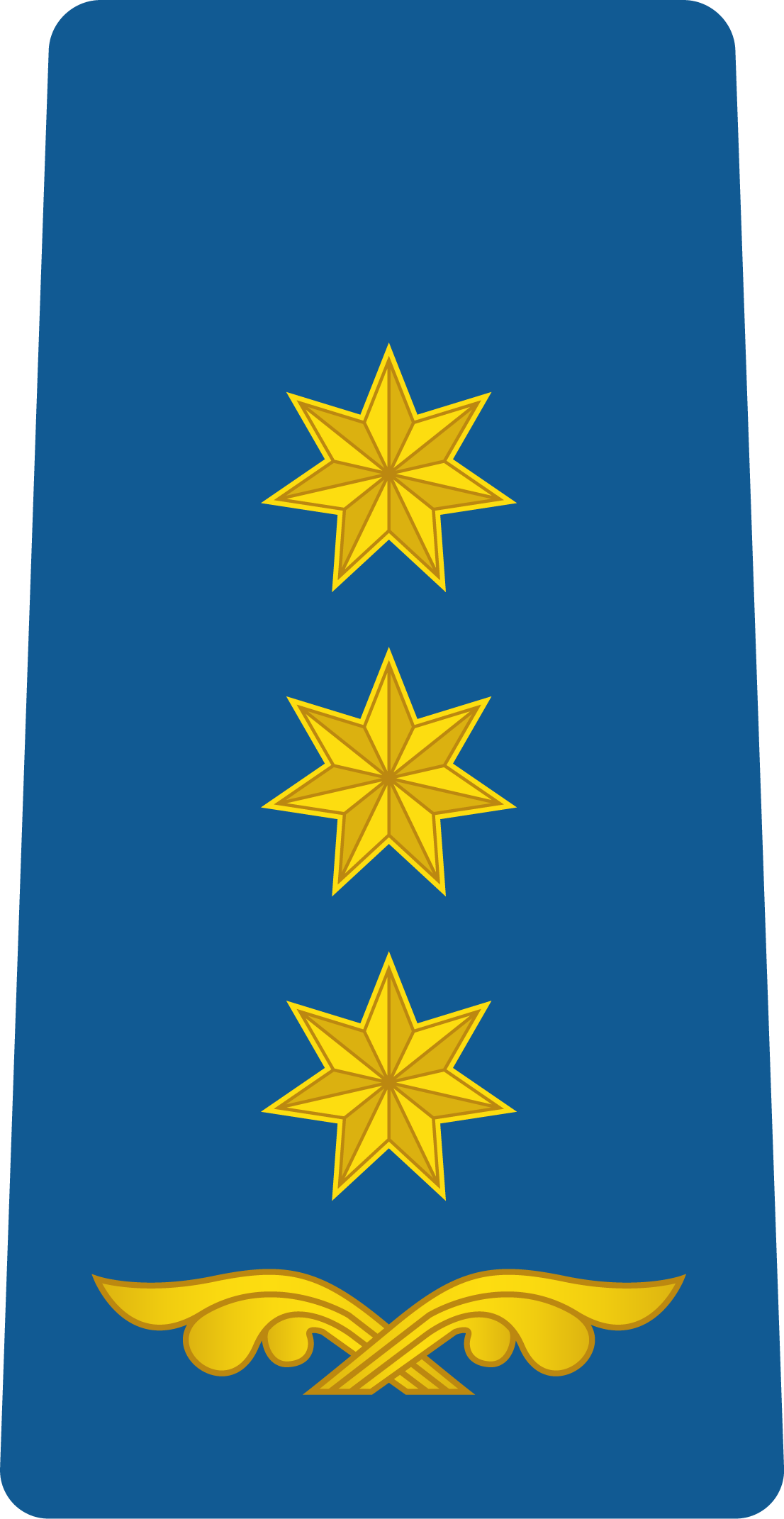
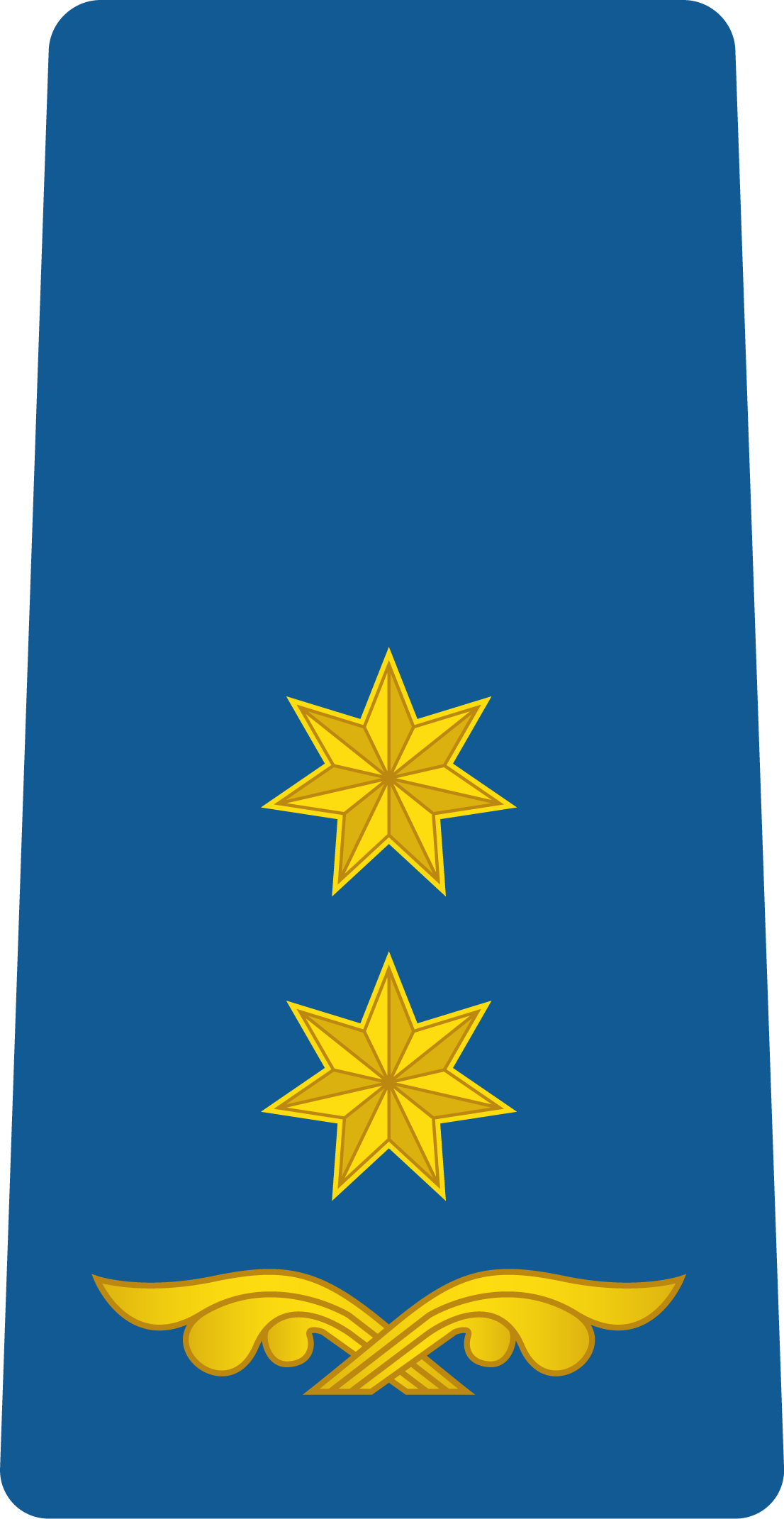
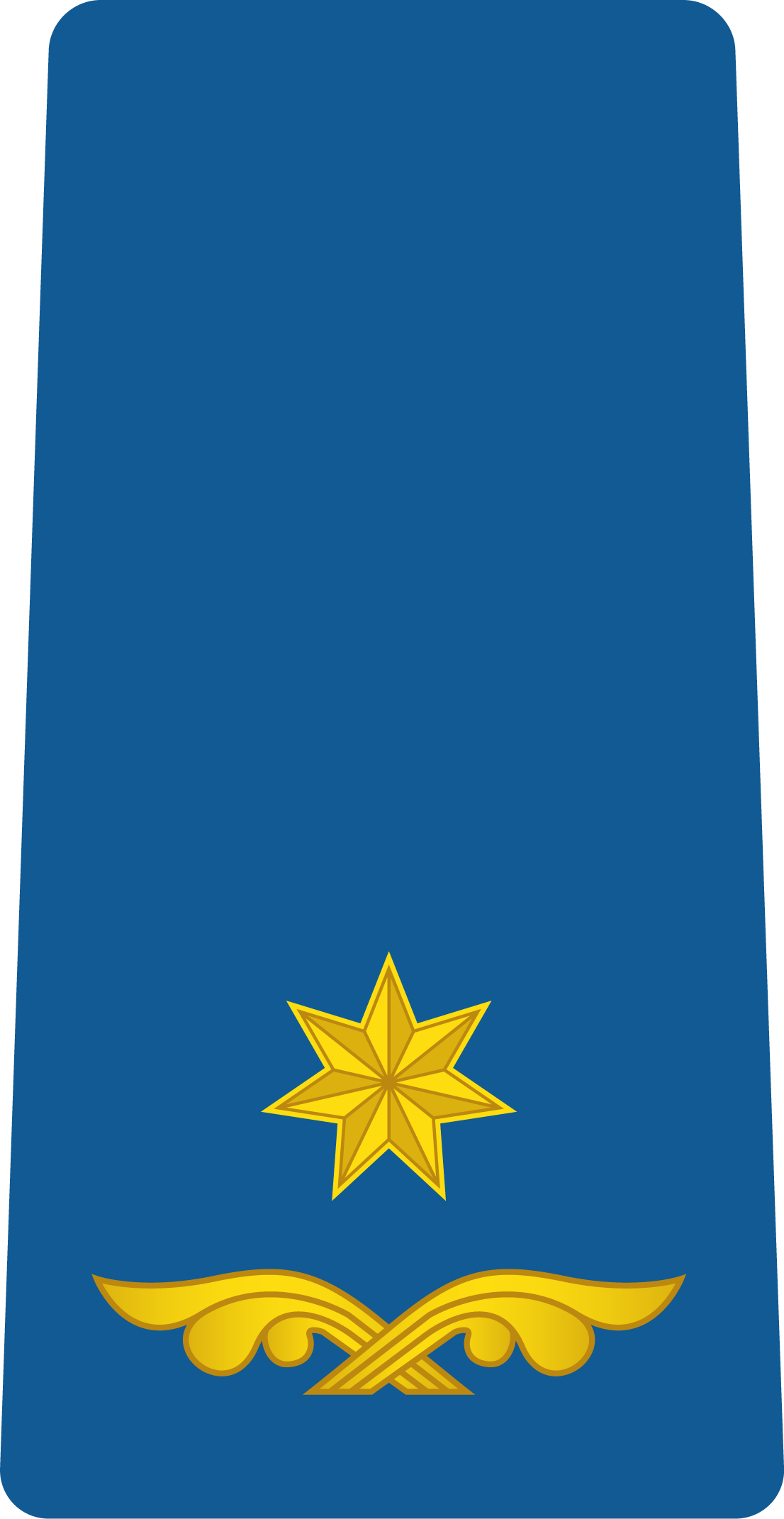
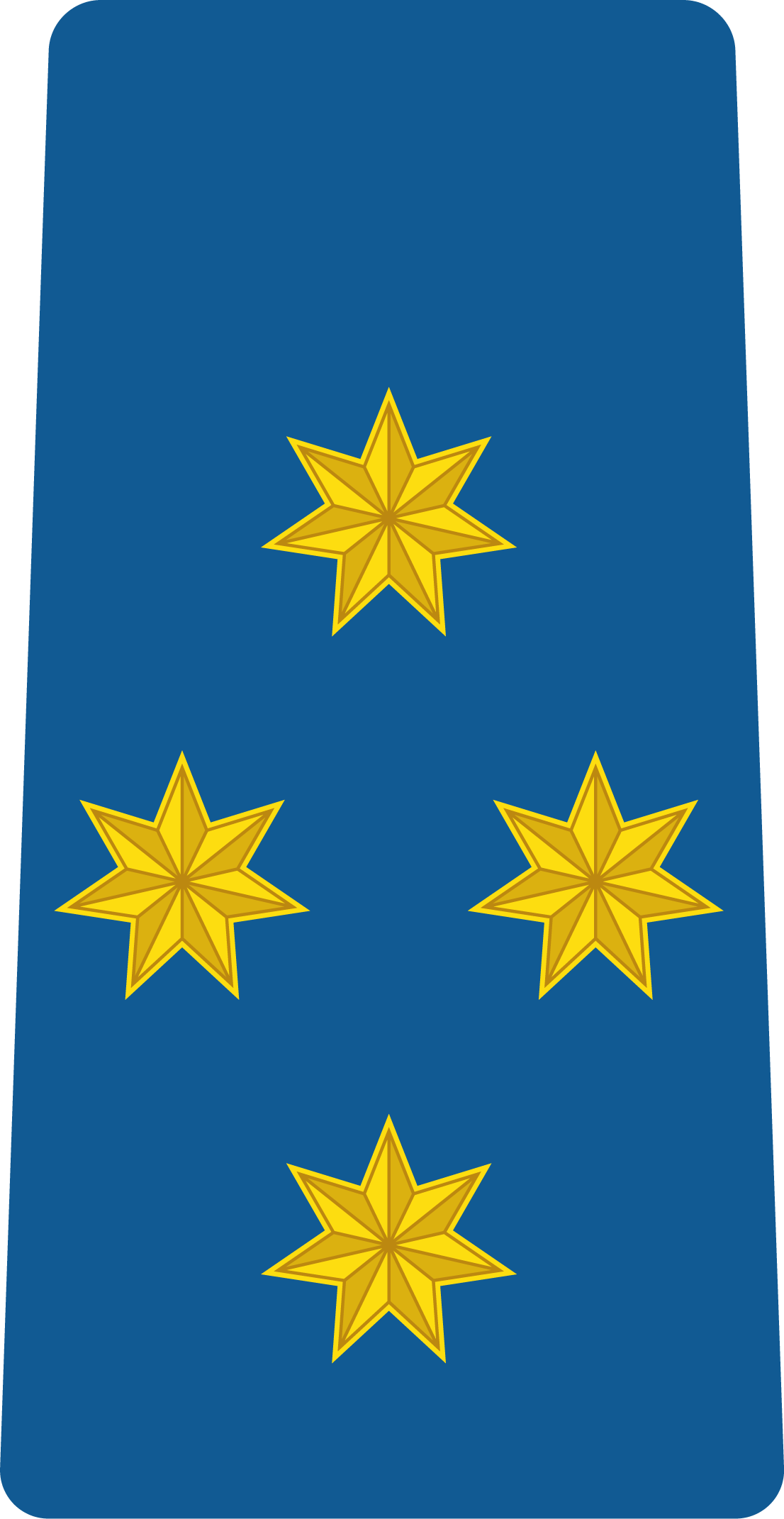
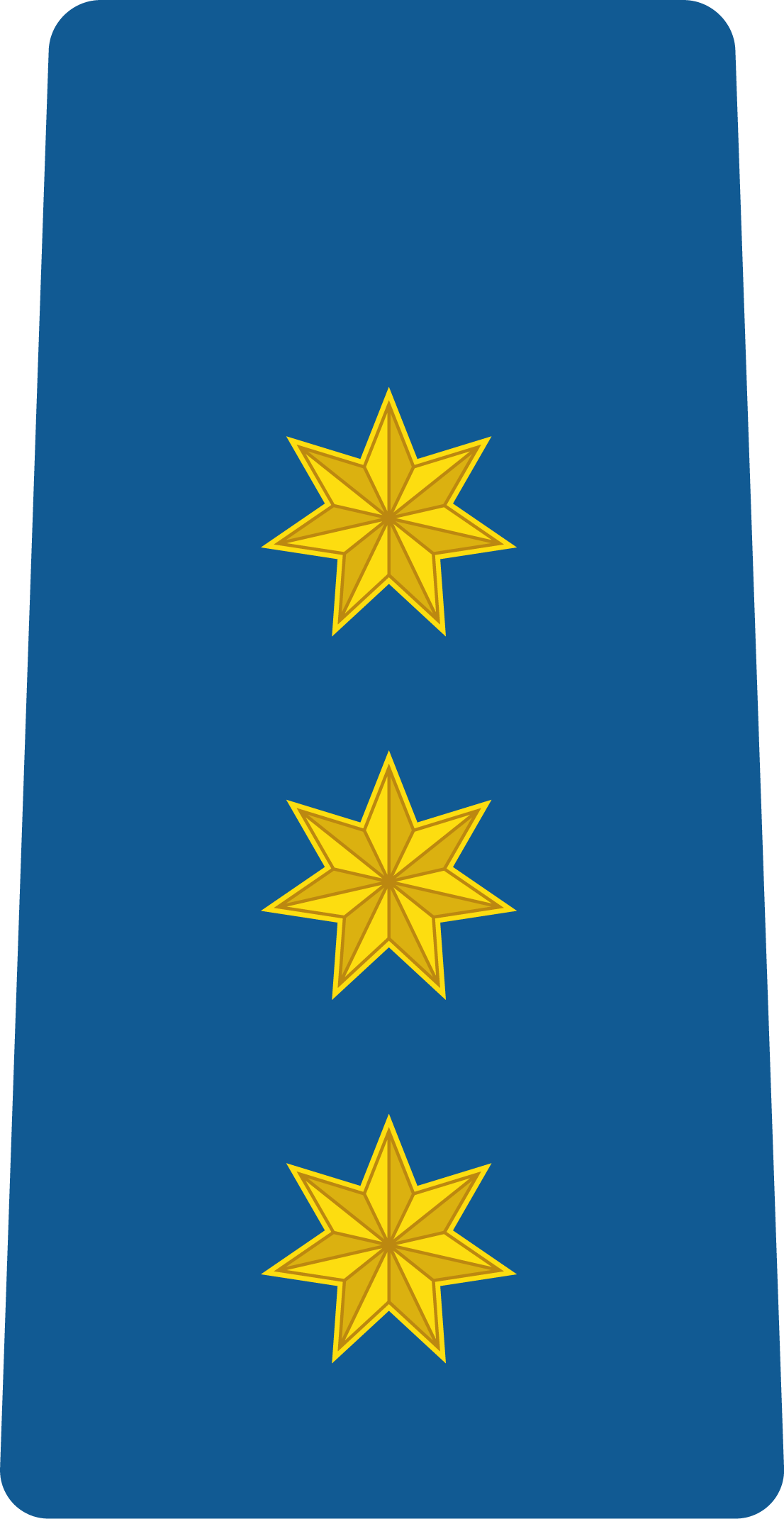
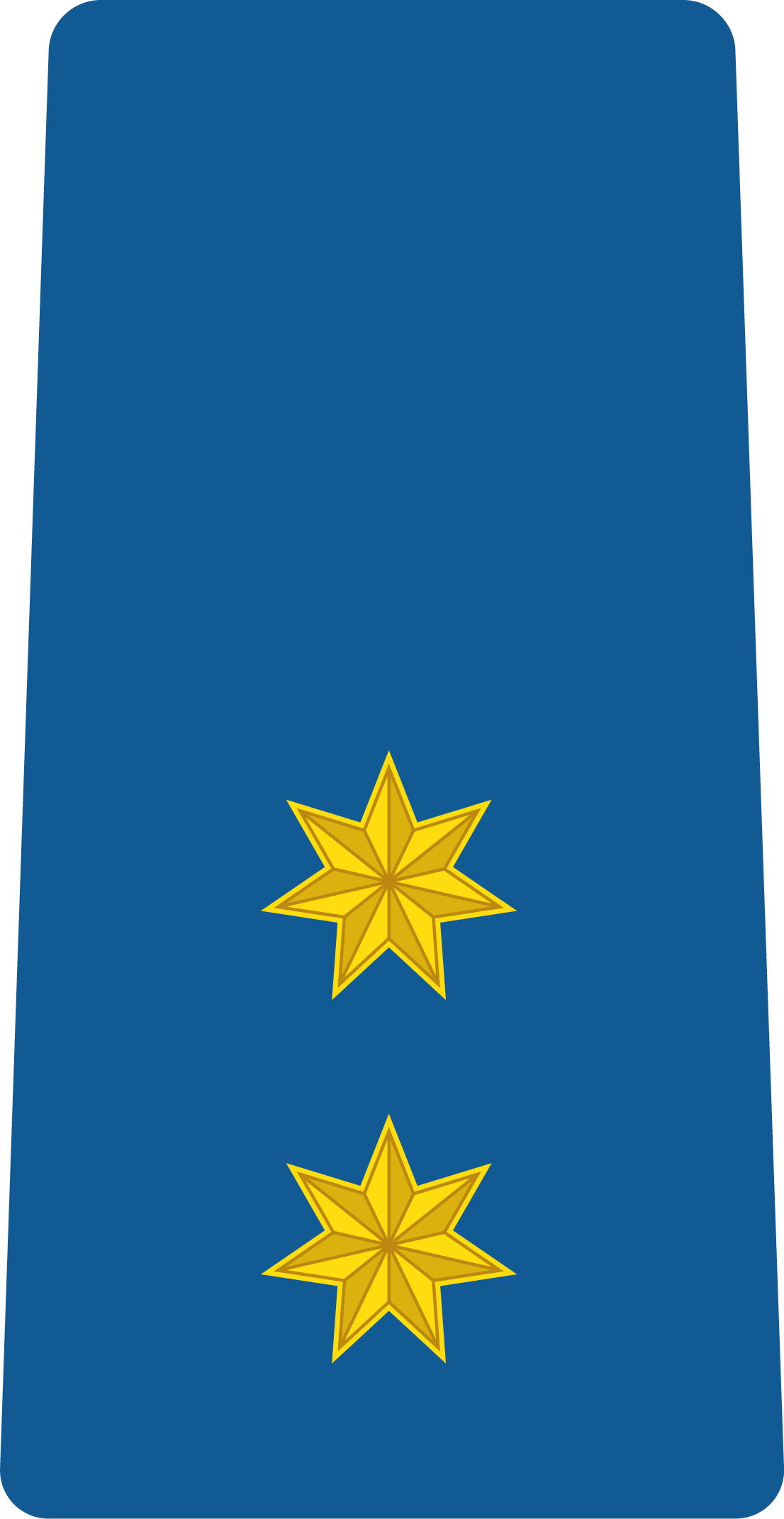
Rank group	General / flag officers				Senior officers			Junior officers
Georgian Air Force
Georgian Air Force	არმიის გენერალი Armiis generali	გენერალ ლეიტენანტი General leit’enant’i	გენერალ მაიორი General maiori	ბრიგადის გენერალი Brigadis generali	პოლკოვნიკი P’olk’ovnik’i	ლეიტენანტ პოლკოვნიკი Leit’enant’ p’olk’ovnik’i	მაიორი Maiori	კაპიტანი K’ap’it’ani	უფროსი ლეიტენანტი Uprosi leit’enant’i	ლეიტენანტი Leit’enant’i

=== Other ranks ===
The rank insignia of non-commissioned officers and enlisted personnel.

Rank group	Senior NCOs				Junior NCOs			Enlisted
Georgian Air Force
Georgian Air Force	მთავარი სერჟანტი Mtavari serzhant’i	მასტერ-სერჟანტი Mast’er-serzhant’i	უფროსი სერჟანტი Uprosi serzhant’i	სერჟანტი Serzhant’i	უმცროსი სერჟანტი Umtsrosi serzhant’i	კაპრალ-სპეციალისტი K’ap’ral-sp’etsialist’i	კაპრალი K’ap’rali	I კლასის რიგითი I k’lasis rigiti	რიგითი Rigiti

== Mission and objectives ==
The objectives of the Georgian Air Force are defined as follows:

- Warfare and mobilization readiness of the Air Forces sub-units
- Protection of sovereignty and control of the air space of Georgia
- The fight against air terrorism
- Participate in the fight against terrorism on land and at sea
- Air defence of state entities and troops
- Destruction of land and naval targets at the enemy's front line and tactical inmost. Providing air support for friendly land and naval forces
- Participation in collective and multinational exercises.

Functions of the Georgian Air Forces:

- Troop and cargo transportation
- Search and rescue of downed aircraft and pilots
- MEDEVAC
- Informing the leadership of the Air Force and the Army about enemy air assaults
- Destruction of enemy manpower, land and naval targets
- Air forces landing
- Aerial reconnaissance

The two major airfields are located near Tbilisi at Vaziani and Marneuli.

== Current inventory ==
=== Aircraft ===
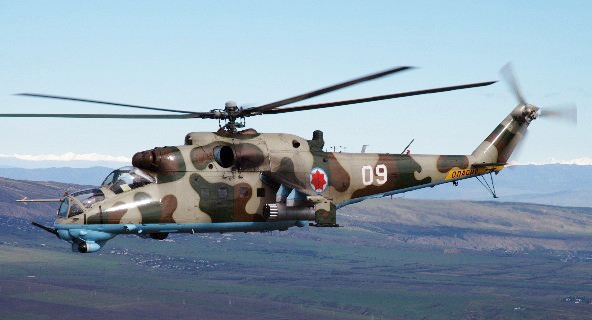
A Georgian Mi-24 in flight

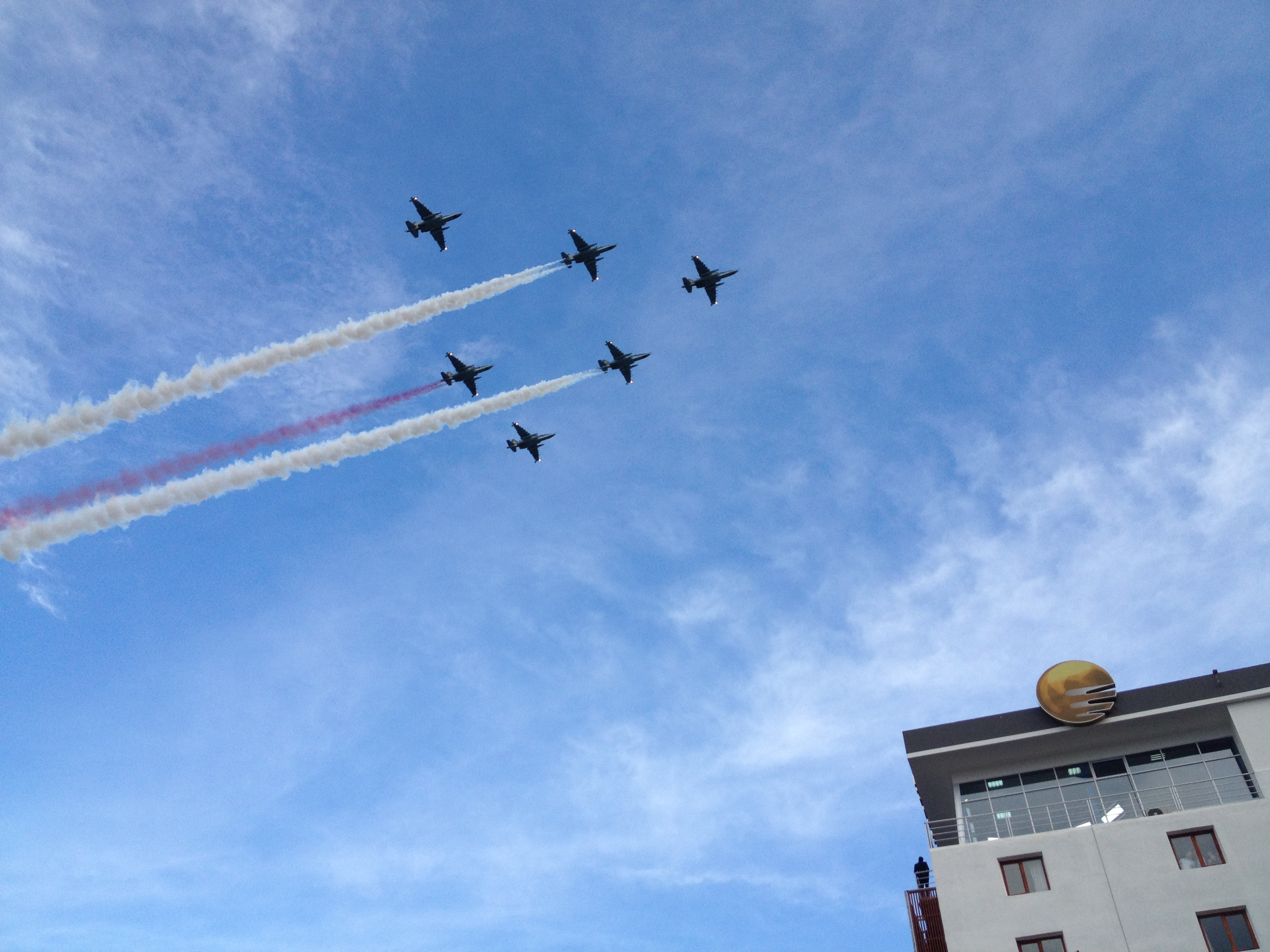
Georgian Su-25s in a parade

Aircraft	Origin	Type	Variant	In service	Notes
Attack
Sukhoi Su-25	Soviet Union	CAS		9	Su-25 (UB/KM) were restored and modernized.
Transport
Antonov An-28	Soviet Union	Transport		2	
Helicopters
Mil Mi-8	Soviet Union	Utility	Mi-8/171	15	20 of them are used by the Border Police of the Ministry of Internal Affairs.
Eurocopter EC145	EU	SAR		3	3 bought in 2022 december delivered in 2024 and using by Border police
Mil Mi-14	Soviet Union	ASW / SAR		2	
Mil Mi-24	Soviet Union	Attack		11	12 were in service before 2008. One was lost in Russo-Georgian war.
Bell UH-1	United States	Utility	UH-1H	6	8 in total
Trainer aircraft
Aero L-39	Czechoslovakia	Jet trainer / Light attack		8	All restored and modernized in 2026
Sukhoi Su-25	Soviet Union	Jet trainer		2	
UAVs
Elbit Hermes 450	Israel	Reconnaissance		10+	
WB Electronics Warmate	Georgia Poland	Kamikaze drone	In production	100+	
WB Electronics FlyEye	Georgia Poland	Reconnaissance	In production	unknown number	
Aerostar	Israel	Kamikaze drone		4+	

=== Air defence ===
Name	Origin	Type	Variant	In service	Notes
Surface-to-air missiles
9K37 Buk	Soviet Union	Medium range	Buk-M1	3 batteries	Former Ukrainian vehicles.
9K33 Osa	Soviet Union	Short range	Osa-AKM	6−10 batteries	Former Ukrainian vehicles, modernized before delivery.

== Bibliography ==
- International Institute for Strategic Studies (2024). "Chapter Four: Russia and Eurasia". The Military Balance. 124 (1): 158–217. doi:10.1080/04597222.2024.2298592. ISSN 0459-7222.
