= Orlando Sanford International Airport =

Public airport in Sanford, Florida, United States

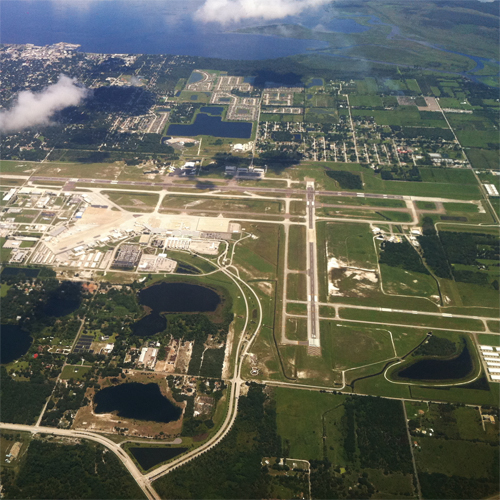
- Orlando Sanford International Airport, as seen from the air in 2011
- IATA: SFB; ICAO: KSFB; FAA LID: SFB

Summary
- Airport type: Public
- Owner: Sanford Airport Authority
- Operator: Airports Worldwide, Inc.
- Serves: Greater Orlando
- Location: Sanford, Florida
- Opened: November 3, 1942; 84 years ago
- Operating base for: Allegiant Air
- Elevation AMSL: 55 ft (17 m)
- Coordinates: 28°46′40″N 081°14′15″W
- Website: www.flysfb.com

Maps
- FAA airport diagram
- Interactive map of Orlando Sanford International Airport

Runways
Direction	Length		Surface
Direction	ft	m	Surface
9C/27C	3,578	1,091	Asphalt
9L/27R	11,002	3,353	Asphalt
9R/27L	5,839	1,780	Asphalt
18/36	6,002	1,829	Asphalt/concrete

Statistics (2025)
- Aircraft operations: 394,203
- Total passengers: 3,166,417 ▲10.04%
- Source: Federal Aviation Administration

Orlando Sanford International Airport (IATA: SFB, ICAO: KSFB, FAA LID: SFB) is a commercial, public use airport in Sanford, Florida, United States, near Orlando. It was built as Naval Air Station Sanford, a master jet base for carrier-based attack and reconnaissance aircraft, and was used by the U.S. Navy until 1969. The airport is now owned by the Sanford Airport Authority and operated by Airports Worldwide.

Sanford serves as a secondary commercial airport for the Orlando area, offering lower landing fees and operating costs than the region's primary airport, Orlando International Airport. However, it is located farther from downtown Orlando and major tourist destinations such as Walt Disney World.

The airport historically handled a large number of European charter flights. Since 1998, most passenger traffic has come from Allegiant Air, an ultra-low-cost carrier focused on leisure travelers, for which Sanford serves as an operating base. The airport was also a focus city for the travel company Direct Air until the carrier ceased operations in 2012.

== History ==
=== Naval Air Station Sanford ===
Orlando Sanford International Airport started life as Naval Air Station Sanford with the airport codes NRJ and KNRJ. Commissioned on November 3, 1942, the base initially concentrated on advanced land-based patrol plane training. It was used by the United States Navy until it closed in 1969.

=== Orlando Sanford International Airport ===
The City of Sanford assumed control of the former NAS Sanford in 1969 and renamed the facility Sanford Airport, hiring the air station's recently retired Executive Officer, Commander J. S. "Red" Cleveland, USN (Ret.), as the first Airport Manager. The city concurrently established the Sanford Airport Authority. For the next twenty-five years, the airport was a general aviation facility and periodically hosted civilian/military air shows and static displays. Initially an uncontrolled airfield, the control tower was reactivated in the early 1970s as a non-FAA facility, employing a number of retired enlisted Navy air traffic controllers who had served at NAS Sanford.

In 1979, air travel clubs like Ports of Call Travel Club and Ambassadair started to use the airport, landing Convair 990s and Boeing 707s, attracted by lower fees and lower fuel prices. The jetliners dwarfed the general aviation aircraft that otherwise used the airport.

Additional name changes followed, to include Sanford Regional Airport, Central Florida Regional Airport, Orlando Sanford Regional Airport and the current Orlando Sanford International Airport. Through the 1980s and 1990s the oldest Navy buildings were demolished while those built in the 1950s and 1960s were renovated for civil use. New buildings and hangars were added.

OLF Osceola was transferred to the control of Seminole County, Florida, but was never officially recommissioned as an active airfield. In the 1970s the former OLF began to be used by general aviation drug-smuggling aircraft as a transshipment point. Following a major drug interdiction by local and federal law enforcement agencies, Seminole County placed large speed bumps at various intervals across the runways to deter future illegal use. By the 1980s the county began to use the site as a landfill and dump, demolishing the remaining runways.

==== 1990s ====
In 1992, parts of the action film Passenger 57, starring Wesley Snipes, were filmed at the then-Orlando Sanford Regional Airport, where it represented a small airport in Louisiana. Shortly after filming, a new control tower was built and air traffic control operations assumed by the FAA. The Navy control tower and the large Navy hangar to which it was attached were demolished.

In the mid-1990s, a new passenger terminal capable of accommodating jet airliners was built. Charter airlines catering to the heavy British tourist demographic that had previously been using Orlando International Airport were offered greatly reduced landing fees at Sanford, and therefore many carriers relocated their operations.

==== 2010–present ====
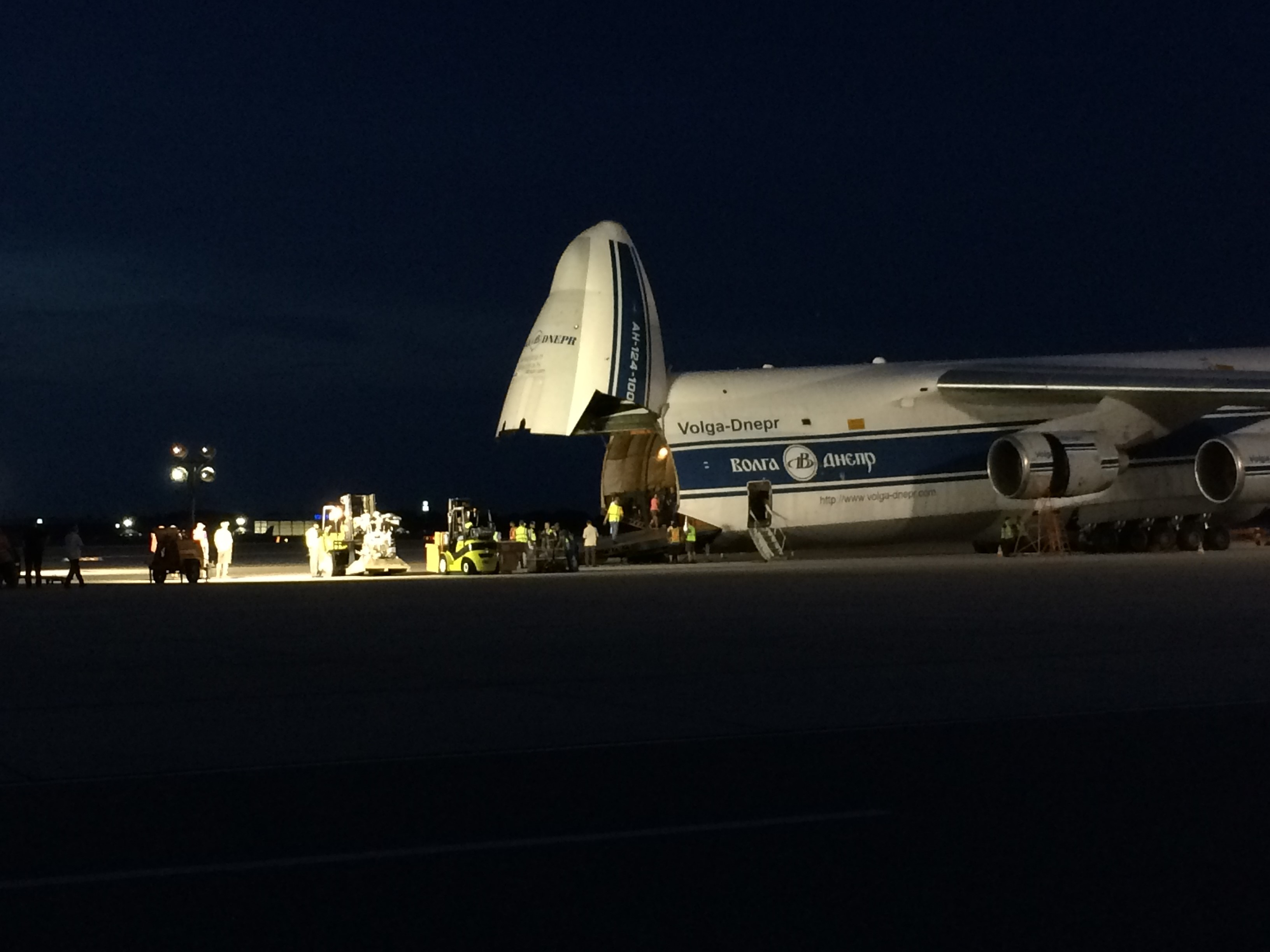
An An-124 uploads cargo at Orlando-Sanford Airport in July 2015.

In 2010, Allegiant Air announced it was moving many flights to the larger and more centrally located Orlando International Airport in order to compete with AirTran Airways. Owing to passenger feedback, all flights have returned to Orlando Sanford.

In 2014, Thomas Cook Airlines moved their operations back to Orlando International Airport after almost a decade of serving Orlando Sanford with the operations of Airtours, JMC Air & My Travel. In September 2019, Thomas Cook ceased all operations.

Icelandair moved to Orlando International Airport in 2015.

In October 2017, Monarch Airlines ceased operations after entering administration, therefore resulting in the termination of their flights to Sanford. All flights were operated using their Airbus A330 and served London Gatwick, Manchester and Glasgow International.

In April 2016, Interjet operated flights to Mexico City. It later switched operations to the main Orlando airport from May 2018.

In 2017, Thomson Airways (now TUI Airways) began operating routes to UK airports. This was the largest international airline at the airport having served eight destinations around the UK. However, in November 2019, TUI Airways announced that, from 2022, it would switch their Orlando operations from Sanford to Melbourne Orlando International Airport, including the daily flights to/from those 8 British airports. This will bring their operations nearer to Port Canaveral, where TUI Cruises will operate from in coming years. The decision has angered many TUI passengers who fly with the company to visit Orlando for Walt Disney World and Universal Orlando Resort.

In July 2021, Canadian low-cost carrier Flair Airlines announced they would launch service between Sanford and five Canadian destinations beginning in winter 2021.

In 2025, the airport announced it had attracted $300 million in proposed development to expand its services and offerings.

== Facilities ==
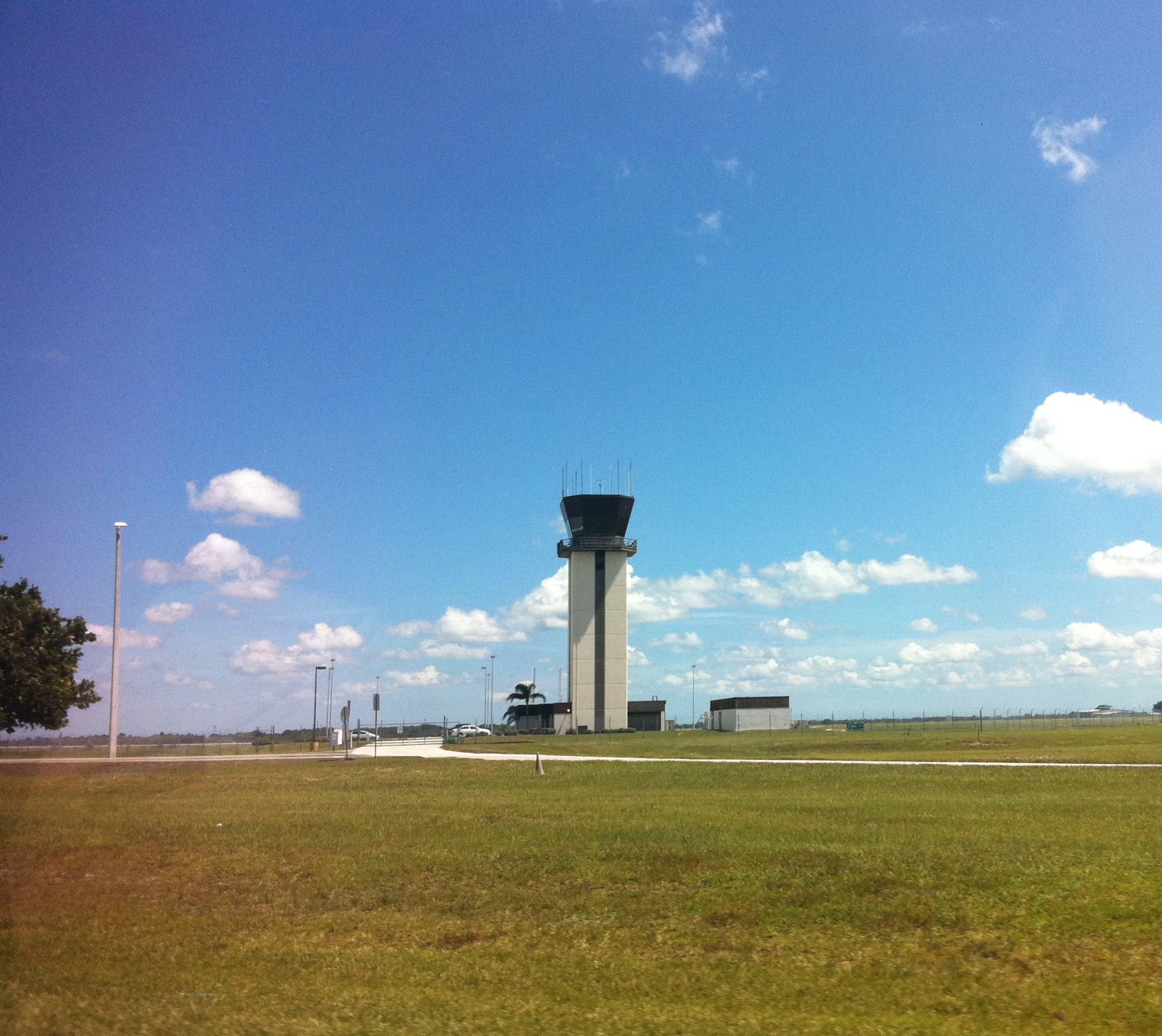
The Sanford International Airport control tower

The airport covers 3,000 acres (1,214 ha) and has four runways:

- Runway 9L/27R: 11,002 x 150 ft. (3,353 x 46 m), asphalt
- Runway 9C/27C: 3,578 x 75 ft. (1,091 x 23 m), asphalt
- Runway 9R/27L: 5,839 x 75 ft. (1,780 x 23 m), asphalt
- Runway 18/36: 6,002 x 150 ft. (1,829 x 46 m), asphalt/concrete

The dominant runway is 9L/27R. This was built from the naval air station's original Runway 9/27, which was 8,000 ft (2,400 m) x 200 ft (61 m) with overruns of 2,145 ft (654 m) and 1,985 ft (605 m). A project to extended runway 9L/27R by 1,400 ft (430 m) to 11,000 ft (3,400 m) was completed on April 1, 2013. Parallel Runways 9C/27C and 9R/27L were built later, the former on a previous taxiway and the latter all-new, for small aircraft. The airport also has Runway 18/36, another Navy runway, for rare northerly fronts in the winter, but this 6000-ft runway is rarely used by airliners.

In 2024, the airport secured a $13 million loan to improve on key infrastructure projects to enhance operations. Plans include an extension to runway 9L/27R as well as a rehabilitation of the terminal ramp, with both planned for completion in late 2026. The plan also includes expansions to car parking lots, which would see 1,000 additional spaces.

The airport is home to Acron Aviation Academy, formerly variously known as L3Harris Airline Academy (owned by L3Harris, formerly L3 Technologies), Aerosim Flight Academy, and Delta Connection Academy (owned by Delta Air Lines). It provides ab initio flight training for prospective airline pilots. The Seminole County Sheriff's Office has a hangar and support facility for aviation elements of the agency's Special Operations Division.

== Airlines and destinations ==
Airlines	Destinations
Allegiant Air	Akron/Canton, Albany, Allentown, Appleton, Asheville, Atlantic City, Bangor, Belleville/St. Louis, Bismarck, Bloomington/Normal, Cedar Rapids/Iowa City, Charlotte/Concord, Chattanooga, Chicago/Rockford, Cincinnati, Clarksburg, Columbia (MO), Columbus–Rickenbacker, Dayton, Des Moines, Elmira, Evansville, Fayetteville/Bentonville, Flint, Fort Wayne, Grand Rapids, Greenville/Spartanburg, Hagerstown, Harrisburg, Huntington, Huntsville, Indianapolis, Kansas City, Key West, Knoxville, La Crosse, Lexington, Little Rock, Louisville, Memphis, Newburgh, Oklahoma City, Omaha, Peoria, Pittsburgh, Plattsburgh, Portsmouth, Provo, Rapid City, Roanoke, Shreveport, Sioux Falls, South Bend, Springfield/Branson, Syracuse, Toledo, Trenton, Tri-Cities (TN), Tulsa Washington–Dulles (begins May 21, 2027); Seasonal: Boston (begins February 13, 2027), Fargo, Grand Forks, Las Vegas, Greensboro, Minot, Nashville, Providence (begins February 13, 2027), Traverse City, Wichita
Arajet	Punta Cana
BermudAir	Seasonal: Belize City (begins December 21, 2026), Bermuda
Contour Airlines	Seasonal: Cape Girardeau (begins December 16, 2026)
Denver Air Connection	Seasonal: Muskegon (begins January 7, 2027)

== Statistics ==
=== Top destinations ===
Busiest domestic routes from SFB (August 2025 – July 2026)
Rank	City	Passengers	Carriers
1	Allentown, Pennsylvania	103,200	Allegiant
2	Knoxville, Tennessee	95,730	Allegiant
3	Asheville, North Carolina	74,470	Allegiant
4	Grand Rapids, Michigan	63,920	Allegiant
5	Cincinnati, Ohio	54,520	Allegiant
6	Flint, Michigan	50,170	Allegiant
7	Harrisburg, Pennsylvania	43,500	Allegiant
8	Bangor, Maine	41,770	Allegiant
9	Appleton, Wisconsin	40,080	Allegiant
10	South Bend, Indiana	38,290	Allegiant

=== Annual traffic ===
Annual passenger traffic (enplaned + deplaned) at SFB, 1995–present
Year	Passengers	Year	Passengers	Year	Passengers	Year	Passengers
1995	48,186	2005	1,649,237	2015	2,480,122	2025	3,166,417
1996	669,576	2006	1,645,989	2016	2,752,410	2026	
1997	1,044,496	2007	1,780,495	2017	2,922,446	2027	
1998	1,198,803	2008	1,837,247	2018	3,094,487	2028	
1999	939,962	2009	1,702,412	2019	3,291,112	2029	
2000	1,086,635	2010	1,165,435	2020	1,545,041	2030	
2001	1,222,391	2011	1,577,307	2021	2,396,108	2031	
2002	1,263,662	2012	1,815,729	2022	2,801,478	2032	
2003	1,253,862	2013	2,032,680	2023	2,941,456	2033	
2004	1,834,315	2014	2,184,701	2024	2,877,526	2034	

== Accidents and incidents ==
- On March 29, 2007, Allegiant Air Flight 758, a McDonnell Douglas MD-80 aircraft that took off from Pease International Airport in Portsmouth, New Hampshire, experienced a hydraulic failure that prevented the nose landing gear from deploying. The plane made a safe landing at Orlando Sanford International Airport, with only one minor injury sustained in the aircraft evacuation.
- On July 10, 2007, a Cessna 310, originating from Daytona Beach International Airport, Florida, en route to Lakeland Linder International Airport, Florida, crashed into two homes in Sanford, Florida, killing five people: the pilot, his passenger, and three people inside the houses. The pilot reported smoke in the cockpit and attempted an emergency landing at nearby Orlando Sanford International Airport. NASCAR said the pilot of the plane was Michael Klemm, a senior captain with NASCAR Aviation. His passenger was Dr. Bruce Kennedy, husband of International Speedway Corporation president Lesa France Kennedy, herself the daughter of the longtime head of NASCAR Bill France, Jr., who had died a month earlier in June 2007. They were the only two people on the plane, according to both NASCAR and the NTSB. Four people also were injured, three of whom were critically burned, authorities said. The NTSB factual report dated December 2007 indicates that the accident was caused by an electrical malfunction, including smoke in the cockpit, that occurred on the previous flight and that was not rectified prior to the accident flight, resulting in the subsequent fire. The accident pilot was informed about the known problem prior to flight but elected to fly the aircraft regardless.
- On March 30, 2018, a Cessna 650 Citation III (N126MT) of 2M Leasing LLC experienced a hydraulic issue en route to Sanford from Macon, Georgia. The aircraft circled the airport for 1 hour and 5 minutes, and the crew lost directional control upon landing. The Citation collided with two parked aircraft and took substantial damage; there were no fatalities.
- On March 14, 2019, a Cessna 650 Citation III (N220CM) of RP Sales and Leasing Inc. took substantial damage while taxiing after landing at Sanford from Charleston, West Virginia. The pilot took an alternate taxiway due to other aircraft being present, and was driven onto grass due to a miscommunication between the pilot and co-pilot, causing the nosewheel to strike concrete. The aircraft was written off.
