= Range-R =

- Type: Through-wall radar
- Manufacturer: L-3 Communications

The Range-R is a hand-held radar device manufactured by L-3 Communications capable of detecting motion through solid walls. The device operates as a finely tuned motion detector, using radio waves to detect the presence of people and movements as small as human breathing at a distance of 50 feet or more.

== Controversy ==
The device was the source of controversy when it was revealed in January 2015 that the FBI and U.S. Marshals Service had deployed the devices to their field offices over the previous two years, with no public disclosure of their use or intended purposes. Officials stated that the devices were to be used for hostage detection and rescue, but privacy advocates expressed concern over possible Fourth Amendment abuses by law enforcement personnel. At the time, L-3 Communications estimated it had sold about 200 devices to 50 different law enforcement agencies within the United States.
