= Kubasik =

Kubasik is a surname. Notable people with the surname include:

- Chris Kubasik (fl. 1983), American businessman
- Christopher Kubasik (fl. 1987), American author
