= WB Group =

Polish defence company

WB Group S.A.

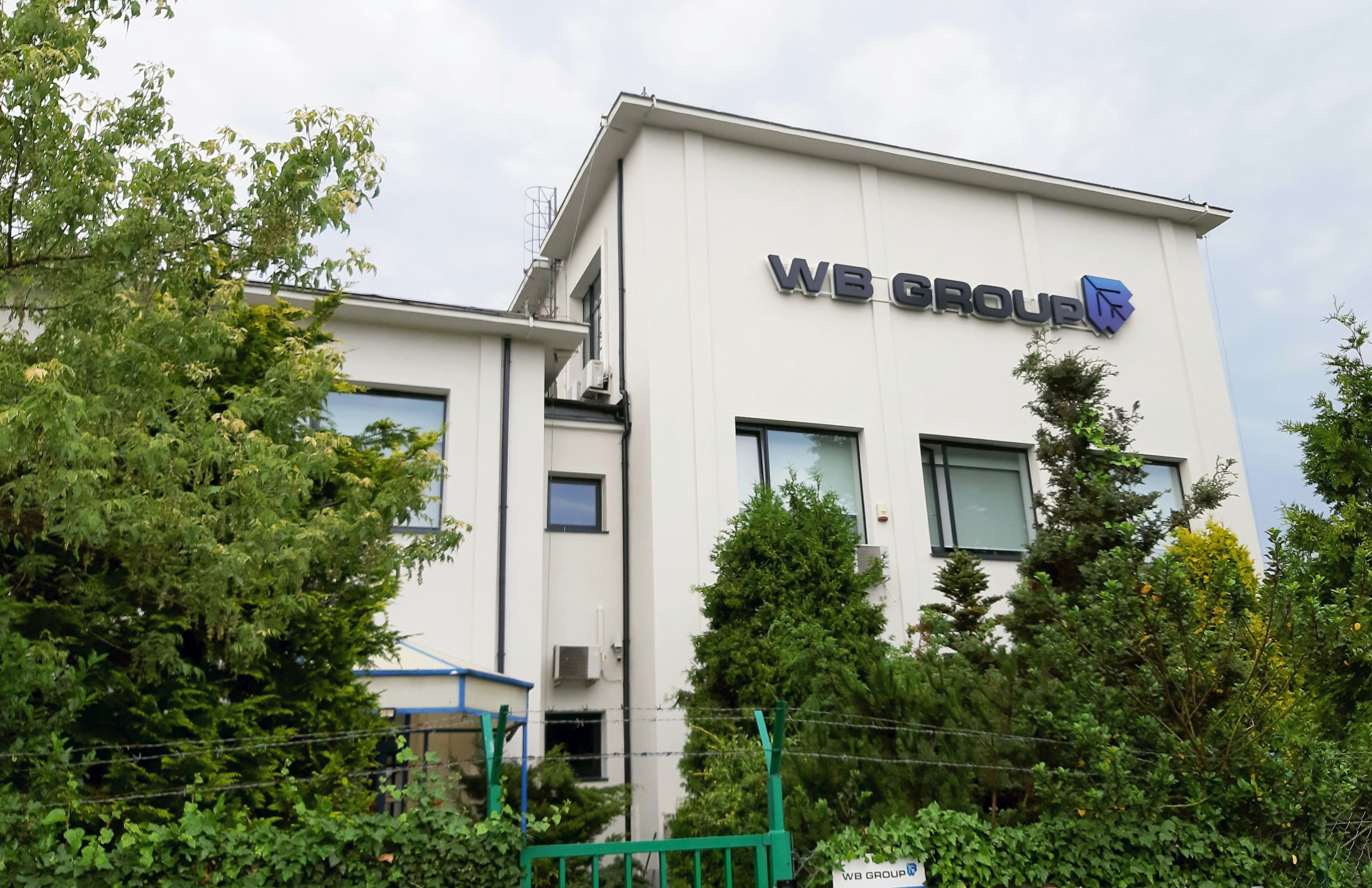
- WB Group headquarters
- Type: Spółka Akcyjna
- Industry: Aerospace, Defence, Security, Electronics
- Founded: 1997
- Headquarters: Ożarów Mazowiecki, Poland
- Key people: Piotr Wojciechowski
- Revenue: US$0.4 billion (2023)
- Website: www.wbgroup.pl/en/

WB Group is a Polish electronics and aeronautics manufacturer, and one of Europe's largest private defence contractors. The company was established in 1997 and is based in Ożarów Mazowiecki. Through its various subsidiaries, WB produces military communications equipment, command and control systems, fire-control systems, unmanned aerial vehicles, and loitering munitions.

WB Group is the second largest arms company in Poland, after Polska Grupa Zbrojeniowa.

WB Electronics Warmate is being used by Ukraine during the Russian invasion. The FONET vehicle and battlefield communication system was licensed to L3Harris Technologies and is used by the United States Armed Forces.

== Acquisitions ==
=== Flytronic ===
In 2009, WB acquired the UAV startup Flytronic, which had created the FlyEye UAV now flown by the Polish Territorial Defence Force and by the Armed Forces of Ukraine under the WB Electronics brand.

=== Radmor ===
Zakłady Radiowe Radmor was a radio equipment manufacturer formed at the Gdańsk University of Technology in 1947. After it expanded from marine-oriented equipment to home audio during the Soviet era, the company was re-privatized in 1994, and the focus on public service radios was restored. Radmor began collaborating with the French Thales conglomerate even before Poland's accession to NATO, and was one of the early members of the consortium developing the European Secure Software-defined Radio.

=== Polish Development Fund ===
In 2017, the Polish Development Fund, a fund of the Polish Treasury, invested PLN 128 million (EUR 30 million or USD 34 million at the time) in the WB Group, in exchange for 24% of shares.

== Suspected Act of Sabotage ==
In late August 2026, a Polish radio station reported on footage from surveillance cameras at the drone factory. The footage reportedly showed a person wearing a balaclava setting a fire and triggering the alarm system.

The Polish government has repeatedly accused Russian and Belarusian intelligence services of infiltrating agents into Poland.
