= Acron Aviation =

US-based avionics manufacturer and flight training provider

- Predecessor: L3Harris Commercial Aviation Solutions
- Founded: 31 March 2025; 19 months ago
- Headquarters: St. Petersburg, Florida, United States
- Number of locations: 9
- Key people: Alan Crawford, Chief Executive Officer
- Number of employees: 1,450 (2023)
- Website: acronaviation.com

Acron Aviation is an avionics manufacturer and flight training provider based in the United States, with locations in the United Kingdom and Thailand. It formally launched in 2025 following the 2023 sale by technology company L3Harris of its Commercial Aviation Solutions division to private equity firm TJC.

== History ==
In 2023, L3Harris decided to divest its commercial avionics and pilot training activities to focus instead on its core defence and security markets. This resulted in the sale of its Commercial Aviation Solutions division to TJC, which rebranded the business Acron Aviation, from the ancient Greek word ἄκρον (ákron), meaning 'peak' or 'top'.

The Acron Aviation brand was introduced only in 2025, but its component businesses have histories spanning several decades. Acron's UK simulation division traces its origin to the 1940s, with the simulation businesses of Redifon (later Rediffusion) and Link-Miles, both subsequently acquired by Thomson-CSF (later Thales), and then by L3 Technologies, which later became L3Harris.

In October 2025, Acron Aviation acquired Trakka Systems, a manufacturer of electro-optical and infrared imaging systems such as airborne cameras, searchlights, and mapping systems, with facilities in the US, Sweden, and Australia.

== Products and services ==
=== Avionics systems ===
Acron's avionics portfolio includes flight recorders for both data and cockpit sounds, navigation products, displays, and Aviation Communication & Surveillance Systems (ACSS), a joint venture with Thales that provides collision avoidance systems and other surveillance and communications equipment.

=== Training systems ===
Acron Aviation is one of few manufacturers of full flight simulators and other flight training devices, with the main production line based in Crawley, UK. The main product is the Reality7e line of full flight simulators. Based on the RealitySeven simulator design launched in 2009 by Thales Training & Simulation, the Reality7e introduces a fully electric motion systems and digital control loading.

=== Flight training ===
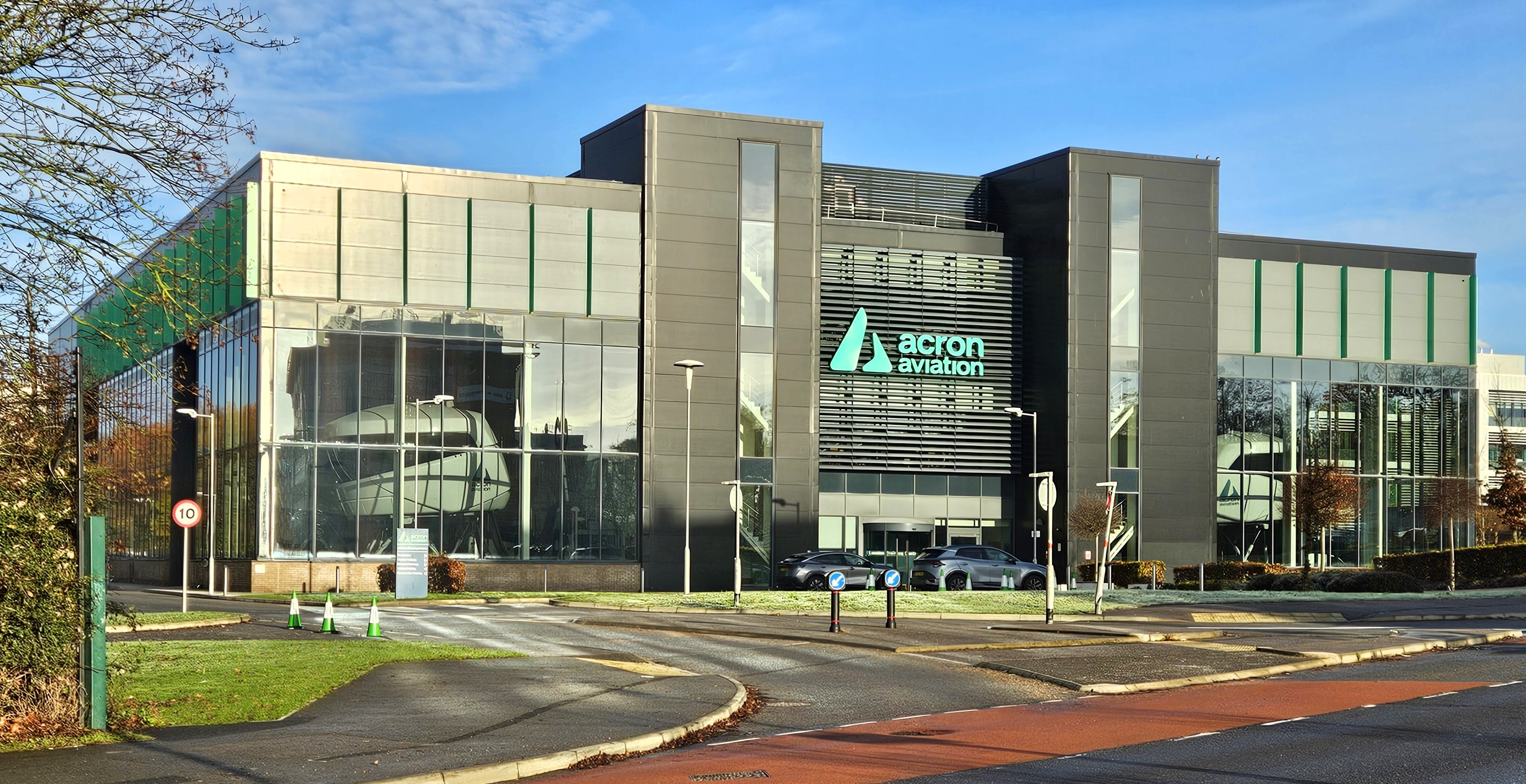
Acron Aviation's London Training Centre in Crawley, UK, in 2025

The company operates Acron Aviation Academy (formerly L3Harris Airline Academy), an airline pilot school with bases at Orlando Sanford Airport, Florida, and Cranfield Airport, UK. It also offers simulator training on a number of types (A320, A330, B737, ATR72) in its three training centres located in Miami, Florida, Bangkok, Thailand, and Crawley.

=== Data analytics ===
Acron's fourth business line provides operational intelligence to customers based on data collected anonymously from simulators and avionics equipment.
