= ACR Electronics =

ACR Electronics, Inc.
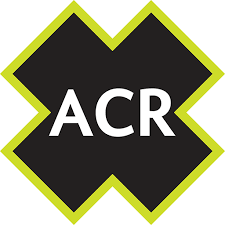
- Company type: Private
- Founded: 1956; 70 years ago
- Headquarters: Fort Lauderdale, Florida, United States
- Products: Search and rescue equipment; Communications equipment
- Owner: The Jordan Company
- Subsidiaries: ARTEX; Ocean Signal; United Moulders Ltd. (UML)
- Website: www.acrartex.com

ACR Electronics, Inc. (also known as the ACR Group) is an American manufacturer that produces search and rescue and communications equipment for use in aviation, military, outdoor recreation, and watercraft.

== History ==
ACR Electronics, Inc. was founded in 1956.

In 2012, the company was acquired by J.F. Lehman & Company (JFLCO) from Cobham Commercial Systems. It was sold to The Jordan Company and merged into Drew Marine in November 2013.

The company acquired Ocean Signal in May 2015.

== Operations ==
ACR Electronics, Inc. is based in Fort Lauderdale, Florida, United States.

== Products ==
ACR Electronics, Inc. produces search and rescue equipment such as emergency locator beacons, electronic distress flares, communications satellite transceivers, strobe lights, emergency position-indicating radiobeacons, and marine VHF radios. Their equipment is designed for use in aviation, military, outdoor recreation, and watercraft.

== Brands ==
=== ARTEX ===
ARTEX produces emergency locator beacons for use in aviation.

=== Ocean Signal ===
Ocean Signal produces safety and communications equipment for use in watercraft.

=== United Moulders Ltd (UML) ===
United Moulders Ltd (UML) produces ISO 12402-7 approved inflation systems for personal flotation devices.

== See also ==
- Emergency locator beacon
- Emergency position-indicating radiobeacon
