= Jay W. Jordan II =

American businessman

Jay Jordan
- Born: John Weaver Jordan; 1947 or 1948 (age 78–79); Kansas City, Missouri, US
- Education: University of Notre Dame; Columbia University
- Occupations: businessman and investor
- Known for: founder of the Jordan Company
- Spouse: Patricia Johnson (divorced)
- Children: 5

John Weaver "Jay" Jordan II is an American businessman and investor, the chairman and founder of the Jordan Company (TJC), a private equity firm.

== Career ==
Jordan spent the first nine years of his career working for the merchant bank Carl Marks & Co., Inc.

Jordan founded TJC in 1982. He invests in manufacturing companies, and follows a broadly similar strategy to that of Warren Buffett.

He is a director of Gulfstream Services, Worldwide Clinical Trials, Young Innovations, Lyric Opera and the Art Institute of Chicago. He is a trustee of the University of Notre Dame.

== Personal life ==
He lives in Deerfield, Illinois, and Amagansett, Long Island, New York.

Jordan was married to Patricia Johnson, daughter of Mr and Mrs Horace L. Johnson Jr. of Overland Park, Kansas, and they divorced before 1992. In 1992, Patricia Johnson Jordan, 43, married Dr. Vincent John Vigorita, son of Pauline S. Vigorita of East Hampton, New York, and the late Dr. John L. Vigorita.
