= GPNVG =

Wide field of view night vision device

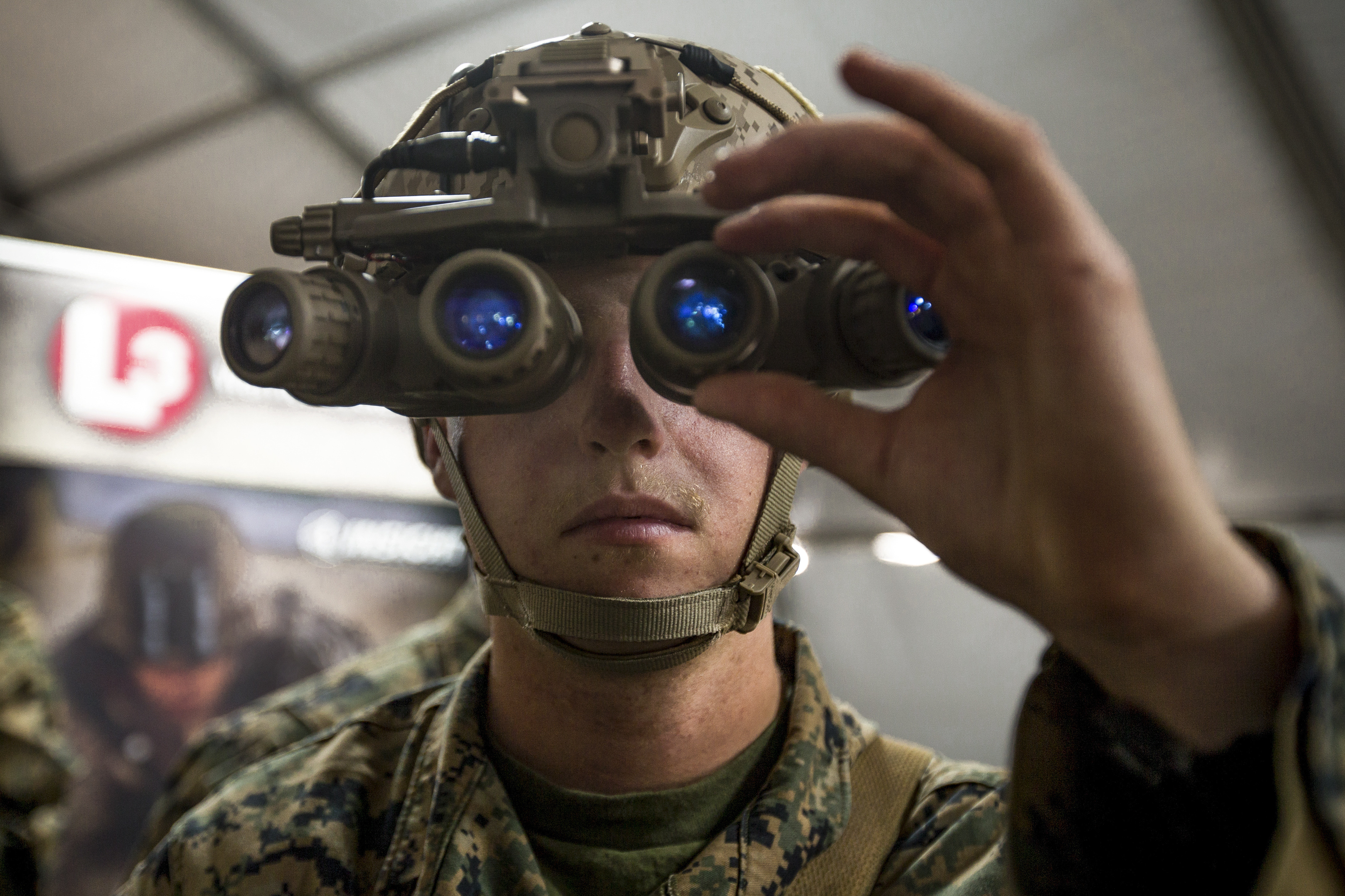
- Place of origin: United States
- Category: Head-mountable

Production history
- Manufacturer: L3Harris Technologies

Specifications
- Weight: 765 g
- Dimensions (L×H×W): 9.1 inches (l) × 4.1 inches (h) × 4.6 inches (w)

The Ground Panoramic Night Vision Goggle (GPNVG) is a wide field of view night vision device manufactured by L3Harris Technologies. Designed for head-mounted use, the system uses four image-intensifier tubes arranged in a panoramic configuration to provide a significantly wider field of view than conventional binocular night vision goggles.

The GPNVG provides a horizontal field of view of 97°, compared to the typical 40° field of view of conventional night vision devices such as the AN/PVS-14. Its image intensification technology amplifies available ambient light to provide visibility in low-light conditions. The system uses 18 mm MX-10160 image-intensifier tubes and uses white phosphor technology. Its modular design also allows individual monocular assemblies to be detached and used as handheld night vision devices.

== Specifications ==
- Film: Unfilmed
- Weight: 765 g
- Magnification: 1×
- Phosphor type: White phosphor
- Field of view: 97° horizontal by 40° vertical
- Range of focus: 45 cm to infinity

== See also ==
- AN/PVS-14
