= L3 Technologies =

Defunct American defense and electronic equipment manufacturer

Coordinates: 40.7492°N 73.9757°W

L3 Technologies, Inc.
- Formerly: L-3 Communications Holdings
- Type: Subsidiary
- Traded as: NYSE: LHX
- Industry: Aerospace, defense
- Predecessor: Loral Corporation's business that was part of Lockheed Martin, Paramax Systems Corporation
- Founded: February 1997; 29 years ago
- Defunct: June 28, 2019; 7 years ago
- Fate: Merged with Harris Corporation
- Successor: L3Harris Technologies
- Headquarters: New York City, United States
- Area served: Worldwide
- Key people: Michael T. Strianese (chairman, CEO); Christopher E. Kubasik (CEO and president)
- Products: AVCATT, ISR systems, numerous specialized components, electronics, avionics
- Revenue: ▲US$9.573 billion (2017)
- Operating income: ▲US$1.020 billion (2017)
- Net income: ▼US$986 million (2017)
- Total assets: ▲US$12.73 billion (2017)
- Total equity: ▲US$5.15 billion (2017)
- Number of employees: 38,000 (2017)
- Website: www.l3t.com

L3 Technologies, formerly L-3 Communications Holdings, was an American company that supplied command and control, communications, intelligence, surveillance and reconnaissance (C3ISR) systems and products, avionics, ocean products, training devices and services, instrumentation, aerospace, and navigation products. Its customers included the Department of Defense, Department of Homeland Security, United States Intelligence Community, NASA, aerospace contractors, and commercial telecommunications and Wireless customers. In 2019, it merged with Harris Corporation to form L3Harris Technologies.

L3 was headquartered in Murray Hill, Manhattan, New York City.

== History ==
L3 was formed as L-3 Communications in 1997 to acquire certain business units from Lockheed Martin that had previously been part of Loral Corporation. These units had belonged to Lockheed Corporation and Martin Marietta, which had merged three years before in 1993. The company was founded by (and named for) Frank Lanza and Robert LaPenta in partnership with Lehman Brothers. Lanza and LaPenta had both served as executives at Loral and Lockheed.

=== Acquisitions ===
==== 1997 ====
- Paramax Systems Corporation from Lockheed Martin. Loral had acquired Paramax in 1995

==== 2000 ====
- Training & Simulation Division of Raytheon Systems Co., based in Arlington, Texas. This company was formerly known as Hughes Training, Inc., and part of the Hughes Aircraft Defense Group purchased by Raytheon from General Motors two years earlier. The division traced its ancestry to the original company formed by Edwin Link, inventor of the Link Trainer airplane simulator, and was renamed accordingly Link Simulation and Training (later Link Training and Simulation).

==== 2001 ====
- KDI Precision Products, Batavia, Ohio. Electronic fuzing, safe and arm devices.
- Litton Electron Devices from Northrop Grumman (renamed L3 Electron Devices)

==== 2002 ====
- Raytheon Aircraft Integration Systems (renamed L3 Integrated Systems; the Greenville, Texas facility is now known as L3 Mission Integration Division, while the Waco, Texas facility is now known as L3 Platform Integration Division)
- SyColeman Corporation, which came about from the joining of Sy Technologies and Coleman Research Corporation
- PerkinElmer Detection Systems from PerkinElmer which became L-3 Security & Detection Systems
- Wescam (currently named L3 Harris Wescam), developer of gyro-stabilized, EO-IR imaging systems

==== 2003 ====
- Ship Analytics, Inc.
- BF Goodrich Avionics
- L-3 Communication MAS from Bombardier Aerospace

==== 2004 ====
- Cincinnati Electronics, Mason, Ohio. Infrared detectors & systems, space avionics.
- Raytheon Commercial Infrared, Richardson Texas. Infrared detectors .

==== 2005 ====
- Titan Corp., after a failed buyout attempt by Lockheed Martin
- L-3 Communication Combat Propulsion Systems, previously owned by General Dynamics Land Systems
- L-3 Communications MAPPS, previously CAE's Marine Controls unit
- Electron Dynamic Devices from Boeing Satellite Systems
- Applied Signal & Image Technology, Linthicum Heights, MD. Geo-location systems for RF emitters.
- Sonoma Design Group, Santa Rosa, CA. Stabilized EO/IR sensors.

==== 2006 ====
- Advanced System Architectures, based in Fleet, Hampshire, United Kingdom. L-3 ASA has core capabilities in the development and through-life management of complex information systems, data fusion and tracking solutions, and interoperable secure communications systems.
- Crestview Aerospace, based in northwest Florida. Crestview Aerospace provides aircraft structures, major airframe assemblies, and military aircraft modifications for leading prime contractors and OEMs in the aerospace industry. (sold in 2017 along with Vertex Aerospace and TCS)
- Nautronix and MariPro, based in Fremantle, Australia and Santa Barbara, California, respectively, from Nautronix plc in Aberdeen, Scotland. Nautronix and MariPro provide acoustic ranges and hydrographics to commercial and defense markets.
- TRL Technology, a specialist defense electronics company based in Gloucestershire, England. TRL Technology is internationally known for development and innovation in the fields of interception, surveillance, electronic warfare, and communications.

==== 2010 ====
- Insight Technology, based in Londonderry, New Hampshire. Insight develops and builds optics, from night-vision goggles to weapon-mounted sights and lasers.

==== 2012 ====
- Thales Training & Simulation (TTSL – partial acquisition), a Thales subsidiary manufacturing civil and military full flight simulators. In August 2012, L-3 acquired TTSL's civil fixed-wing simulation business based in Crawley, UK, integrating it into L-3 Link Simulation & Training. The division was later renamed L3 Commercial Training Solutions, and then L3 Commercial Aviation Solutions. In 2023, the business was sold to private equity firm TJC, becoming part of Acron Aviation.

==== 2015 ====
- CTC Aviation Group, a commercial pilot training school based in Southampton, UK. The school was rebranded L-3 CTC.

==== 2016 ====
- Aerosim Flight Academy in Sanford, Florida and Aerosim Technologies in Burnsville, Minnesota. Both the Sanford school and L-3 CTC were integrated into L3 Commercial Training Solutions and rebranded L3 Airline Academy.
- MacDonald Humfrey (Automation), a Luton, UK–based checkpoint security and automation company
- ExMac (Automation), a Droitwich, UK-based automated material handling company.

==== 2017 ====
- Open Water Power, a Somerville, Massachusetts–based battery startup spun out of MIT. Its novel aluminum-water battery technology promises a tenfold improvement in the endurance of unmanned underwater vehicles.
- Ocean-Server Technology, a Fall River, Massachusetts–based small business specializing in lithium-ion battery, sensor, and robotic mini-sub (UUV) products
- ASV Global, a Lafayette, Louisiana–based business with international offices in Portchester specializing in Autonomous Surface Vehicles for commercial and defense markets.

==== 2018 ====
- In October 2018, L3 announced an all-stock "merger of equals" with Florida-based Harris Corporation, to be closed (subject to approvals) in mid-2019. The merger was completed on June 29, 2019, and the new company, L3Harris Technologies, Inc., is based in Melbourne, Florida, where Harris was headquartered.

== Business organization ==
As of 2017, L3 was organized under four business segments:

- Electronic Systems
  - Advanced Programs
  - Aviation Products and Security
  - Power and Propulsion Systems
  - Precision Engagement and Training
- Aerospace Systems
  - Aircraft Systems
  - ISR Systems
  - MAS
  - Vertex Aerospace
- Communication Systems
  - Advanced Communications
  - Broadband Communications
  - Space and Power
  - Tactical SATCOM
- Sensor Systems
  - Space & Sensor Systems
  - Maritime Sensor Systems
  - Worldwide Surveillance & Targeting Missions
  - Warrior Sensor Systems

=== Management ===
Frank Lanza, CEO and co-founder, died on June 7, 2006. CFO Michael T. Strianese was named as interim CEO, and was later appointed chairman, president and CEO of the company on October 23, 2006. In 2015, former Lockheed Martin executive Christopher E. Kubasik was named president and COO, with Strianese remaining as chairman and CEO. On July 19, 2017, Strianese announced that he would retire as CEO on December 31, 2017, to be succeeded by Kubasik, but would remain as board chairman. As of January 1, 2018, Christopher E. Kubasik became chief executive officer and president of L3 Technologies.

=== Naming ===
L3 Technologies was originally named L-3 Communications for the last initials of its founders Frank Lanza, Robert LaPenta, and Lehman Brothers. Despite the similarity in naming, there is no corporate connection between L3 Technologies, formerly known as L-3 Communications, and networking provider Level 3 Communications, whose name is often abbreviated "L3" in informal industry communication.

On December 31, 2016, the company changed its name from L-3 Communications Holdings, Inc. to L3 Technologies, Inc. to better reflect the company's wider focus since its founding in 1997. The company's website changed from L-3com.com to L3T.com, but the company's NYSE ticker symbol of LLL remained the same.

== Products ==
- L-3 ProVision, millimeter wave airport passenger screening system
- L-3 eXaminer SX, 3DX, and XLB, airport baggage scanning systems
- L-3 OptEX, trace level explosive detection system
- AVCATT, mobile aviation training simulator
- Orchid, total development & simulation environment (Power, Marine)
- EOTech, holographic weapon sights
- L-3 Sonoma EO, electro optical imaging systems, 1508M Dragon Eyes, 1205MD, 2111X, 2514X, & 2711G
- OMNI, encryption device that adds secure voice and secure data to a standard analog telephone or modem connected computer, made in "Standard" model with a 56 kbit/s limit and "OMNIxi" with a 1.5 Mbit/s limit
- EMARSS, Enhanced Medium Altitude Reconnaissance and Surveillance System

== Controversies ==
=== Federal contract suspension ===
In 2010, it was announced that L3's Special Support Programs Division had been suspended by the United States Air Force from doing any contract work for the US federal government. A US Department of Defense investigation had reportedly found that the company had, "used a highly sensitive government computer network to collect competitive business information for its own use." A US federal criminal investigation ended the temporary suspension on July 27, 2010.

=== Counterfeit parts ===
On November 4, 2010, L3 issued a part purge notification to prevent future use of Chinese counterfeit parts, but did not notify its customers whose display systems suffered from much higher than expected failure rates.

=== EOTech defective holographic sights lawsuit ===
In 2015, L3 Technologies agreed to pay $25.6 million to settle a lawsuit with the U.S. Government. L3 was accused of knowingly providing the U.S. military with optics that failed in extreme temperatures and humid weather conditions. These sights were provided to infantry and special operations forces operating in Afghanistan and Iraq, as well as civilians and law enforcement.

The civil fraud lawsuit was filed by Preet Bharara, in the Southern District of New York. The lawsuit alleged L3 officials have known since 2006 that the holographic sights being sent to Iraq and Afghanistan failed to perform as advertised in extreme temperature ranges. The lawsuit alleges that the FBI independently discovered the thermal drift defect, where the point-of-aim would shift when the sights were exposed to temperature extremes, in March 2015 and presented EOTech with "the very same findings that the company had documented internally for years. Shortly thereafter, EOTech finally disclosed the thermal drift defect to the DoD." According to court documents, EOTech had advertised that its sights performed in temperatures ranging from -40 degrees to 140 degrees Fahrenheit, and in humid conditions.

== See also ==
- Top 100 Contractors of the U.S. federal government
