= TJC L.P. =

American private equity firm

- Type: Private
- Industry: Private equity
- Founded: 1982; 44 years ago
- Founder: John W. Jordan II
- Headquarters: New York, New York, United States
- Products: Leveraged buyout, growth capital
- Total assets: $6 billion
- Number of employees: 25+
- Website: tjclp.com

TJC L.P. (formerly known as The Jordan Company) is an American private equity firm focused on leveraged buyout and management buyout investments in smaller middle-market companies across a range of industries.

The firm, a limited partnership based in New York City, was founded in 1982. The Jordan Company was founded by John W. Jordan II, prior to which he spent nine years at Carl Marks & Co., a merchant banking firm.

Since its founding, the firm has completed over 90 investments and raised approximately $6 billion of investor commitments across its two Jordan Resolute funds and older pledge vehicles. Jordan's 2002 fund raised $1.5 billion of commitments and its second fund in 2007 raised $3.6 billion of capital.

Among the dozens of current and past investments completed by TJC are American Safety Razor Company, Bojangles' Famous Chicken 'n Biscuits (in conjunction with Durational Capital Management), Carmike Cinemas, Fannie May, Great American Cookie, Harvey Gulf, Lepage's Industries, Lincoln Industrial Corporation, Newflo Corporation, RockShox, Rockwood Industries, TAL International Group, Universal Technical Institute and Vivid Imaginations.

It acquired ACR Electronics and Drew Marine in November 2013.

In 2018, the company raised $3.63 billion for its fourth fund, according to a filing with the Securities and Exchange Commission. In 2020, TJC joined Diligent Corporation's Modern Leadership Initiative and pledged to create five new board roles among its portfolio companies for racially diverse candidates.

In 2020, TJC announced that an affiliate of The Resolute Fund IV, LP, acquired the residential heating, ventilation, and air conditioning (HVAC) company Heartland Home Services.

In 2021, the company purchased a majority share of engineered plastics manufacturer Spartech from Nautic Partners for an undisclosed amount.

In 2023, TJC announced its purchase of L3Harris's Commercial Aviation Solutions division for $800 million. The business was relaunched in 2025 as Acron Aviation.
