= AVCATT =

Aviation training simulator

AVCATT (Aviation Combined Arms Tactical Trainer) is a mobile aviation training simulator developed by L-3 Communications, Link Simulation & Training for the United States Army in 2001. Entire units (suites) have been fielded.

AVCATT is used by Active, Reserve and Army National Guard components. AVCATT supports unit collective and combined arms training for the AH-64, UH-60, CH-47 and OH-58 aircraft. Other AVCATT modules, such as the Non-Rated Crew-Member Manned Module (NCM3, a sub-system of AVCATT), can be linked to this base configuration to support specific unit training requirements. The NCM3 supports the training of non-rated crew members in crew coordination, flight, aerial gunnery, hoist and sling load-related tasks.

AVCATT is a mobile, transportable, multi-station device that supports unit collective and combined arms training for helicopter aircrews. The AVCATT occupies two trailers with the NCM3 adding a third trailer containing two reconfigurable modules for the CH-47 and UH-60. Both the AVCATT and NCM3 use helmet-mounted displays (HMD).

== Management ==
The Army Aviation Center (Fort Novosel) is a proponent.

TRADOC Capability Manager - Virtual & Gaming (Fort Leavenworth) is the Capability Manager. PEO STRI PdM Maneuver Collective Training System, part of PM Integrated Training Environment is the Material Developer.

Cole Engineering Services, Inc, provides Post Deployment Software Support.

AVT Simulation provides concurrency upgrades as part of the AVCATT Reconnaissance Attack Contract.

It is interoperable with CCTT and VCCT.

== Terrain data bases ==
- Afghanistan
- Fort Bliss
- Fort Campbell
- Fort Cavazos
- Fort Drum
- Fort Irwin National Training Center
- Fort Bragg
- Fort Benning
- Fort Stewart
- Grafenwoehr-Hohenfels
- Hawaii
- Iraq
- Joint Base Lewis McChord
- Korea
