= L3Harris =

American defense and electrical equipment manufacturer

L3Harris Technologies, Inc.
- Type: Public
- Traded as: NYSE: LHX; S&P 500 component
- Industry: Aerospace and defense
- Predecessor: L3 Technologies; Harris Corporation
- Founded: June 29, 2019; 7 years ago
- Headquarters: Melbourne, Florida, United States
- Key people: Sam Mehta (President and CEO); Lewis Hay III (Chairman)
- Revenue: ▲US$21.3 billion (2024)
- Operating income: ▲US$1.92 billion (2024)
- Net income: ▲US$1.50 billion (2024)
- Total assets: ▲US$42.0 billion (2024)
- Total equity: ▲US$19.5 billion (2024)
- Number of employees: 47,000 (2025)
- Website: l3harris.com

L3Harris Technologies, Inc. is an American technology company, defense contractor, and information technology services provider that produces products for command and control systems, wireless equipment, tactical radios, avionics and electronic systems, night vision equipment, intelligence, surveillance and reconnaissance (C3ISR) systems and products, ocean systems, instrumentation, navigation products, training devices and services, and both terrestrial/spaceborne antennas for use in the government, defense, and commercial sectors.

The company was formed from the merger of L3 Technologies and Harris Corporation on June 29, 2019, which made it the sixth-largest defense contractor in the United States.

== History ==
=== L3 Technologies and Harris Corporation ===
The "Harris Automatic Press Company" was founded by Alfred S. Harris in Niles, Ohio, in 1895. The company spent the next 60 years developing lithographic processes and printing presses before acquiring typesetting company Intertype Corporation. In 1967, they merged with Radiation, Inc. of Melbourne, Florida, a developer of antenna, integrated circuit, and modem technology used in the space race. The company headquarters was moved from Cleveland to Melbourne in 1978. In May 2015, Harris finalized the purchase of competitor Exelis Inc., almost doubling the size of the original company.

L-3 Communications was formed in 1997 to acquire certain business units from Lockheed Martin that had previously been part of Loral Corporation. These units had belonged to Lockheed Corporation and Martin Marietta, which had merged three years before in 1993. The company was founded by, and named for, Frank Lanza and Robert LaPenta in partnership with Lehman Brothers. Lanza and LaPenta had both served as executives at Loral and Lockheed. The company continued to expand through mergers and acquisitions to become one of the top ten U.S. government contractors. At the end of 2016, the company changed its name from L-3 Communications Holdings, Inc. to L3 Technologies, Inc. to better reflect the company's wider focus since its founding in 1997.

Between 1999 and August 2021, L3Harris and predecessors spent $131.9 million lobbying for radio procurement for ICE and CBP ($20,000), the Intelligence Authorization Act, the National Defense Authorization Act, and Defense appropriations ($1,510,000), DHS fund appropriations for unmanned vehicles ($430,000), and night vision systems research ($20,000).

In 2008, 72 Iraqi civilians sued L3 Services for human rights violations they had endured at Abu Ghraib and other prisons in Iraq, including "torture; cruel, inhuman, or degrading treatment; war crimes; assault and battery; sexual assault and battery; intentional infliction of emotional distress; negligent hiring and supervision; and negligent infliction of emotional distress." A settlement was reached on October 10, 2012, which was the "first positive resolution to a U.S. civil case challenging detainee treatment outside the United States in the larger 'war on terror' context".

In 2012, L3 subsidiary KDI Precision Products participated in the sale of 11,500 JDAM bomb fuzes to Israel, part of a $647 million contract deal. These were among the weapons used by the IDF in the 2014 Gaza War; the U.N. High Commissioner for Human Rights highlighted the IDF's weapons usages, which included attacks on densely populated civilian areas, as constituting potential war crimes.

=== Post-merger ===
In October 2018, Harris and L3 announced an all-stock "merger of equals". As part of that deal, Harris was required to sell its night vision division. The reasoning was that a merger of Harris and L3's night vision departments would create an effective monopoly on the night vision industry. The merger was completed in June 2019. The new company, L3Harris Technologies, Inc., is based in Melbourne, Florida, where Harris was headquartered. The new company was led by former Harris CEO William M. Brown as the Chairman and CEO, with former L3 CEO as the President and COO. In June 2021, Brown turned over the role of CEO to Chris Kubasik, retaining the title of Executive Chair, and Kubasik adding the title of Vice Chair.

Between 2006 and July 2021, L3Harris was awarded 136 U.S. Customs and Border Protection and Immigration and Customs Enforcement contracts totalling $308.2 million, "as well as six blanket purchase orders potentially worth up to $6 billion".

In 2018, L3Harris acquired two Australian zero-day exploit development companies, Azimuth Security and Linchpin Labs, which were merged as Trenchant. The two companies are reportedly suppliers of zero-day exploits for the Five Eyes and the Federal Bureau of Investigation.

In 2019, L3Harris paid $13 million to settle allegations that Harris, before the merger, violated Arms Export Control Act and International Traffic in Arms Regulations regulations. According to a proposed charging letter Harris Corporation violated AECA (22U.S.C.2751 et seq.) and ITAR (22 CFR parts 120–131) for a total of 131 separate violations.

In January 2022, L3Harris reorganized its business structure, eliminating the Aviation Systems business segment and distributing its divisions between the remaining three Integrated Mission Systems, Space & Airborne Systems, and Communications Systems segments.

In June 2022, Chris Kubasik succeeded as the Chair following Bill Brown's retirement. That same month it was reported to have held talks to purchase the Israeli company NSO, which builds Pegasus spyware. White House officials heard of the talks and voiced opposition, resulting in L3Harris discontinuing its plans.

In December 2022, L3Harris agreed to buy Aerojet Rocketdyne Holdings for $4.7 billion in cash. The acquisition was completed on 28 July 2023.

In October 2025, Israel entered into a memorandum of understanding with L3Harris to facilitate the acquisition of new light attack aircraft intended for border defense, aimed at developing the Israeli Sky Warden variant.

In January 2026, L3Harris agreed to sell a majority stake in the Aerojet Rocketdyne "Space Propulsion and Power Systems" sector to AE Industrial Partners, who will spin off the business under the name "Rocketdyne". The deal includes the RL10 upper stage engine used on the Vulcan rocket, but not the RS-25 engine used by the Space Launch System. The remaining Missile Solutions business is planned to undergo an IPO as a new company, with L3Harris retaining controlling ownership and the US Government investing $1 billion. Both transactions are expected to be completed in the second half of 2026.

In June 2026, during the Eurosatory defence exhibition in Paris, Baykar subsidiary Skydagger signed a memorandum of understanding (MoU) with L3Harris Technologies for the integration of its interceptor drone technologies, including the Hunter variant, into L3Harris’s VAMPIRE counter-unmanned aerial system (C-UAS) platform.

== Business organization ==
As of 2026, L3Harris is organized under three business segments: Space & Mission Systems, Communications and Spectrum Dominance, and Missile Solutions. It is led by a 13-member board of directors, including Chairman Lewis Hay III and board member and CEO Sam Mehta, following the departure of former Chair and CEO Chris Kubasik.

=== Space and Mission Systems ===
Space and Mission Systems specializes in space mission, payloads, and sensors for satellite navigation, ISR, weather, and missile defense; ground systems for space command and control and tracking; optical and wireless networking for situational awareness and air traffic management; defense avionics; and electronic warfare countermeasures; intelligence, surveillance, and reconnaissance (ISR) and signals intelligence systems; electrical and electronic systems for maritime use; electro-optical systems including infrared, laser imaging, and targeting systems; defense aviation systems including weapons systems and unmanned aerial vehicles or UAVs (commonly known as drones), and commercial aviation services including the L3Harris Airline Academy. It comprises divisions including some of those formerly in the Aviation Systems segment and Wescam.

In November 2023, L3Harris announced that it would sell its Commercial Aviation Solutions business to The Jordan Company for up to $800 million. The sale was completed in March 2025, and the business was renamed Acron Aviation.

=== Communications & Spectrum Dominance ===
Communications & Spectrum Dominance specializes in tactical communications, broadband communications, night vision (inherited from L3 Technologies, unrelated to night vision developed by Harris, ITT, or Exelis), and public safety.

=== Missile Solutions ===
Missile Solutions consists of the "Missile Systems" segment acquired from Aerojet Rocketdyne, plus the RS-25 engine product line. L3Harris agreed to sell the "Space Propulsion and Power Systems" segment of Aerojet Rocketdyne to AE Industrial Partners in 2026, who will spin it off under the business under the name "Rocketdyne". The remaining Missile Solutions segment will be spun off as a new company in the second half of 2026 via an IPO, with L3Harris retaining controlling ownership and the US Government investing $1 billion.

== Products ==
- AVCATT, a mobile aviation training simulator
- StingRay and Hailstorm phone trackers
- OpenSky wireless communication system
- TCAS, FDR & CVR products of the Aviation Communication & Surveillance Systems product line, serviced and managed by OEMServices Divested in 2025 with the Commercial Aviation Solutions business; now part of Acron Aviation.
- hC2 L3Harris Command and Control Battle Management Software Suite—former "Harris Command and Control"
- Integrated Core Processor, main aircraft computer in F-35 Lightning II and in C-130J Super Hercules
- GPNVG-18, a night vision device that utilises four night vision tubes to give the user a wider field of view
- AN/PVS-31A BNVD and 1531 BNVD. Binocular articulating night vision devices - standard issue goggle for US SOCOM.
- Azimuth, technology enabling access to data from locked mobile phones. L3Harris acquired Azimuth in 2018 through an acquisition of Australian company Azimuth Security.
- Red Wolf and Green Wolf Missiles, kinetic strike missile and electronic warfare/intelligence missile, respectively
- L3Harris AEWC using Gulfstream G550 as AERIS A or Bombardier Global 6500 as AERIS X

== Controversies and legal issues ==
L3Harris has faced several allegations and settlements related to financial misconduct and employment practices. These include allegations of violating the False Claims Act through double billing on Department of Defense contracts and overcharging for parts. Additionally, the company has been involved in ERISA lawsuits related to excessive 401(k) fees. There have also been claims of discriminatory practices, including allegations of wrongful termination due to PTSD. Furthermore, L3Harris has settled export violation charges with the Department of State.

=== False Claims Act violations ===
L3Harris has been accused of violating the False Claims Act by double-billing the Department of Defense (DoD) for parts and materials. For example, while performing contracted work between 2006 and 2014, they allegedly knowingly billed the DoD for nuts, bolts, and other parts both as part of a material additive factor and as individual parts, resulting in overcharging.

L3Harris has paid significant sums to settle these allegations. In 2023, they also settled for $21.8 million regarding the double-billing allegations, and in 2025, they agreed to pay $62 million to settle allegations related to false statements and violations of the Truth in Negotiations Act.

=== Employee Retirement Income Security Act lawsuit ===
In 2022, eight former employees filed a class action lawsuit against L3Harris for allegedly violating the Employee Retirement Income Security Act (ERISA) by charging excessive record keeping and administrative fees in their 401(k) plans, as well as failing to monitor investment options. In 2024, the company settled the lawsuit for $650,000.

=== Wrongful Termination lawsuit ===
In 2020, a former employee sued L3Harris, alleging that he was wrongfully terminated due to his PTSD. After an initial summary judgement in L3Harris' favor, the Ninth Circuit Court of Appeals reinstated the lawsuit, stating a reasonable jury could find that the employee's PTSD was a factor in his termination.

=== Retaliation claim lawsuit ===
In 2024, another employee sued L3Harris over claims that he was terminated for reporting potential misconduct by another employee, potentially violating the National Defense Authorization Act and the False Claims Act. The case was later settled.

=== Export violations ===
In 2019, L3Harris agreed to settle with the US Department of State over 131 alleged violations of the International Traffic in Arms Regulations (ITAR) and the Arms Export Control Act (AECA), and were ordered to pay $13 million.

=== Arms sales to Israel ===
L3Harris Technologies has faced sustained criticism, protests, and divestment campaigns from anti-war groups, human rights organizations, and pro-Palestinian advocacy initiatives—including the Boycott, Divestment, Sanctions (BDS) movement and the Boston-based activist collective The Mapping Project—over its military contracts and technological partnerships with Israel.

=== Spyware controversy ===
L3Harris has been involved in the development of surveillance technology, specifically the "Stingray" device, which has raised privacy concerns and been criticized for its use by law enforcement.

In 2025, an iPhone hacking toolkit internally named "Coruna" was found to be used by Russian government-affiliated hacking groups to target Ukraine and also by Chinese cybercriminals in for-profit malware attacks. Later in 2026, this hacking toolkit was confirmed to have been, at least in part, developed by L3Harris' hacking and surveillance technology division, Trenchant.

=== Air flight ground stop ===
According to US Secretary of Transportation Sean Duffy, L3Harris, the primary government contractor working on the FAA Telecommunications Infrastructure, was working on the transition from copper wire to fiber optic cable that caused the November 13, 2026, nationwide grounding of flights.

== Layoffs ==
In April 2024, L3Harris announced a 5% reduction in its global workforce, impacting employees across various locations and departments. This workforce reduction was expected to affect hundreds of jobs in Palm Bay and other locations where the company operates. Additionally, in February 2025, L3Harris announced layoffs affecting 179 employees at its Rockwall facility in Texas, primarily due to the conclusion of the JAVA MAN program, an aerial intelligence, surveillance, and reconnaissance program. The company noted that the majority of these affected employees resided out of state and worked remotely overseas. In early 2025 additional layoffs were announced, as part of a cost-cutting measure and company restructuring effort known as LHX NeXt. This initiative aimed to streamline operations and achieve $1 billion in cost savings over the next three years.

While L3Harris has not publicly disclosed the exact number of individuals impacted by the layoffs, it's evident that these workforce reductions are part of a broader trend of operational adjustments in the defense and technology sectors, driven by economic pressures and the need for agility and financial stability. L3Harris is also addressing challenges in its satellite supply chain, which has faced issues with late deliveries from a key supplier. The company has responded by shifting to a new supplier to ensure timely deliveries.
