= Chris Kubasik =

American businessman

Christopher E. Kubasik is the former chair and chief executive officer of L3Harris Technologies, a provider of global ISR, communications and networked systems, and electronic systems for military, homeland security and commercial aviation customers. In this position, he was responsible for leading the execution of L3Harris's strategic growth objectives.

== Career ==
Kubasik served as a partner at Ernst & Young from 1996 to 1999, when he left to join Lockheed Martin Corporation as controller.

He became Executive Vice President and CFO of Lockheed Martin in 2004, and President and COO in 2010. In April 2012, Lockheed Martin announced that Kubasik would take over as CEO after the retirement of chairman and CEO Robert J. Stevens at the end of that year. Before that could happen, an ethics investigation confirmed that Kubasik had a long-term extramarital affair with a subordinate employee, and on November 9, 2012, Stevens asked for and received Kubasik's resignation.

Kubasik joined the board of Spirit AeroSystems in 2013 and became president and CEO of Seabury Advisory Group in 2014.

Kubasik joined L3 Technologies in October 2015 as President and COO. On July 19, 2017, the L3 Board elected Kubasik to the position of CEO and president, and to the Board of Directors effective January 1, 2018. When L3 merged with Harris Corporation in 2019 to form L3Harris Technologies, Kubasik was president and chief operating officer of the new company. He was appointed chief executive officer in June 2021 and was appointed as chair in June 2022.

On August 16, 2026, L3Harris Technologies terminated Kubasik as CEO for "conduct that was not consistent with the values of the Company outlined in the code of conduct". Details of the misconduct were not published, but were substantiated by an independent ethics investigation, and the news outlets Semafor and The Wall Street Journal reported that the investigation was focused on allegations that Kubasik had "engaged in an inappropriate relationship with an employee" and exhibited "aggressive, profane behavior". A spokesperson for Kubasik denied that a relationship with a subordinate was the cause for dismissal.

=== Education ===
Kubasik earned his bachelor's degree (Magna Cum Laude) in accounting from the University of Maryland's School of Business in 1983. In 1997, he attended the Executive Program at Northwestern University’s Kellogg School of Management. In 2004, he completed the Systems Acquisition Management Course for Flag Officers at the Defense Acquisition University, Fort Belvoir. He is also a Certified Public Accountant.
