= WB Electronics FlyEye =

Unmanned aerial vehicle

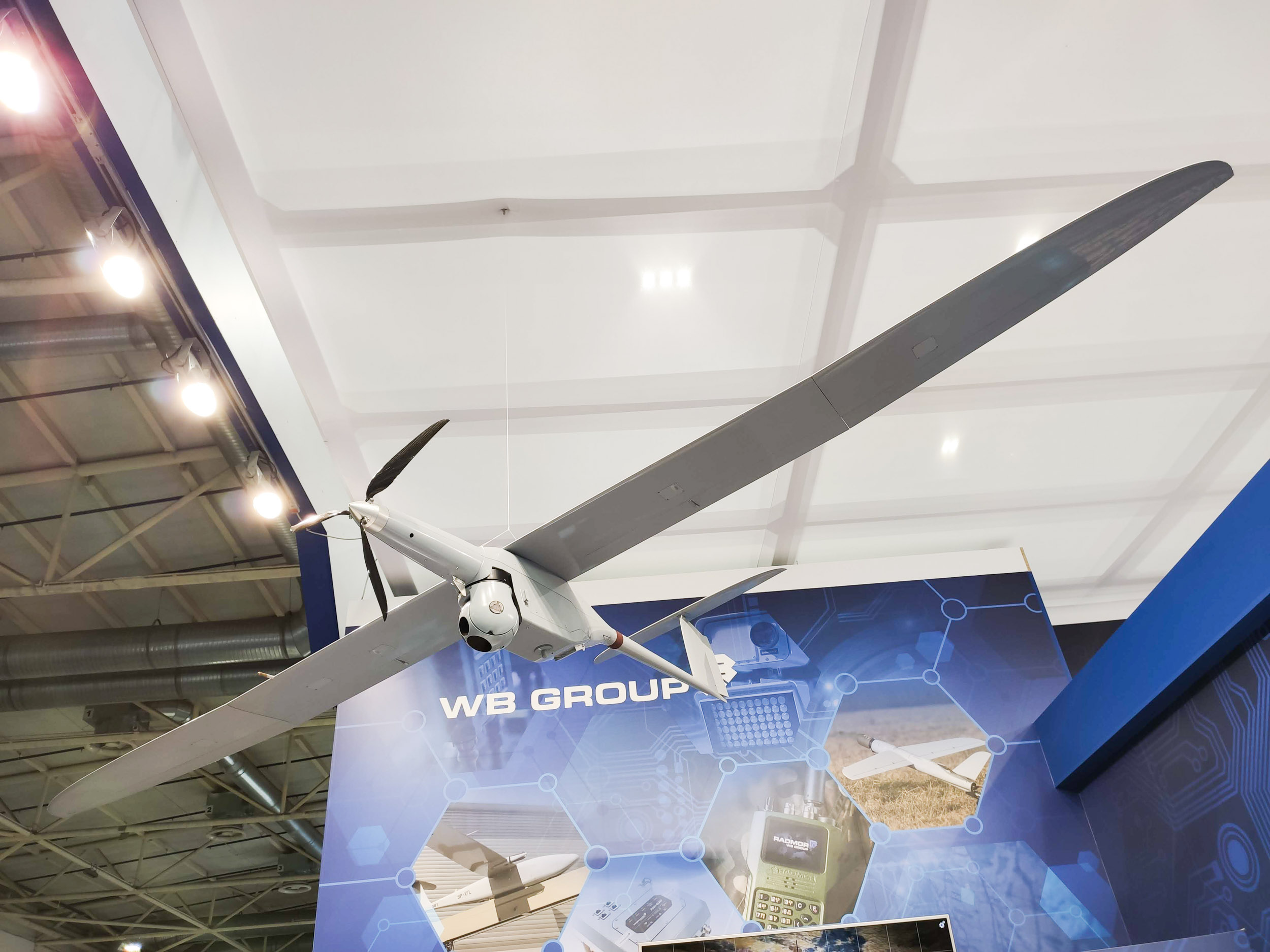

General information
- Type: Unmanned aerial vehicle
- National origin: Poland
- Manufacturer: WB Electronics
- Primary user: Poland; Ukraine
- Number built: 1000+ (2024)

History
- Introduction date: 2010
- In service: 2011 - present

FlyEye – an unmanned aerial vehicle developed by the Polish company Flytronic, belonging to the WB Group, intended for close reconnaissance.

== History ==
FlyEye is a mini UAV of Polish design and production, developed by engineers from the Flytronic company in Gliwice, owned by WB Electronics. The unmanned aerial vehicle was first publicly presented on June 14, 2010 at Eurosatory in Paris.

On December 10, 2010, WB Electronics presented a slightly modernized version of FlyEye compared to the original design (among other things, the shape of the empennage was changed by replacing the classic stabilizer system with a T-shaped system, the shape of the wings was modified - their surface area and chord were increased).

In October 2010, the Nil Military Unit announced a tender for the delivery of two sets of unmanned aerial vehicles. The tender was won by the WB Electronics product. Two sets, each with four cameras, were ordered on October 29, 2010. FlyEye was the next unmanned aerial vehicle in the Polish Army's equipment after Aeronautics Orbiter, Aeronautics Aerostar and Boeing ScanEagle. Unlike all the others, it is a Polish design and product. On November 18, 2010, an agreement was signed to purchase two more sets, intended for KTO Rosomak combat vehicles, in the Multi-Sensor Reconnaissance and Surveillance System version.

On February 13, 2013, after negotiations conducted as part of an urgent operational need, an agreement was signed to deliver another 12 sets of FlyEye drones to the Polish Army. Nine of them went to the Special Forces - Special Forces Command and Support Unit, and three to the Land Forces - Air Reconnaissance Squadron of the 1st Land Forces Aviation Brigade and to the Rocket and Artillery units. The new devices were to be delivered by 15 November 2013. A year later, on 30 June 2014, an agreement was signed to purchase another set, which the Armament Inspectorate announced on 4 July of the same year. All devices were delivered in 2013–2014.

On 23 December 2014, the tender for mini-class unmanned aerial vehicles for the Border Guard was resolved. The winner was WB Electronics FlyEye. On 13 February 2015, the Guard made public information about the order for devices for the Nadbużański Border Guard Unit in Chełm.

Initially, FlyEye used Windows-based software, which was later replaced with its own operating system based on Linux. At the turn of the first and second decade of the 21st century, an improved version of FlyEye 3.0 was implemented into production, which has new cameras, a greater operational range (up to 80 km) and a wider possibility of automated cooperation with the ZZKO Topaz artillery battlefield management system.

On October 19, 2018, the Armament Inspectorate of the Ministry of National Defense publicly announced the fact of conducting negotiations with WB Electronics on the acquisition of a dozen FlyEye sets for the Territorial Defense Forces (WOT). On December 3, 2018, the Armament Inspectorate of the Ministry signed an agreement for the delivery of three sets of FlyEye unmanned cameras, consisting of a total of 12 aircraft. The agreement provides for the possibility of purchasing another nine sets. The ordered sets were delivered to the recipient on December 19, 2018. Unlike the previously accepted cameras, the FlyEye that has been used in the WOT equipment is already the third generation of aircraft. They are equipped with a new optoelectronic head, a modernized transceiver station, a new battery power supply system, a modernized control and management station, and a modified transport box and backpacks. On July 18, 2019, an annex to the agreement of December 3, 2018 was signed. The annex provides for the delivery of another nine modernized FlyEye sets. The set includes four flying vehicles. The delivery for WOT was to be completed by the end of 2019.

On February 15, 2022, another 11 sets were ordered for the Polish Armed Forces. Until the date of signing the agreement, FlyEye was the most widely used unmanned vehicle in the Armed Forces. 31 sets were delivered, including 124 aircraft. By 2022, 54 sets of four cameras were ordered. In December 2022, a contract was signed with the manufacturer to modernize five older sets to the 3.0 standard.

The Territorial Defense Forces reported that in 2021, the FlyEye cameras belonging to this formation spent 2,000 hours in the air. Twice as much as in 2020. 70% of the flight hours were spent during missions conducted at night. One third of the airstrikes carried out in 2021 were related to the "Strong Support" operation conducted on the Polish-Belarusian border, which was part of the Polish authorities' response to the migration crisis on the border with Belarus.

According to the manufacturer, in mid-March 2024, the thousandth FlyEye was produced.

== Specifications ==
Technical details FlyEye mini UAS

- Wingspan: 3,6 m
- Length: 1,8 m
- Maximum speed: 60 - 120 km/h
- Maximum altitude: 3000 m (9,800 ft) AMSL
- Flight endurance: 2.5 h +
- Propulsion: electric engine

== Design ==
FlyEye is a composite, high-wing cantilever monoplane. The drone takes off by hand and does not require any additional devices to support take-off. Thanks to the steep-rotor take-off, the structure can be launched into the air from very small, limited areas, urban areas, forest clearings. Take-off readiness can be achieved in less than 10 minutes. There is a foldable propeller at the front of the aircraft, so the head and payload are placed under the fuselage in the area of the center of gravity. The flight of the drone can be controlled entirely manually from the control station (at a distance of up to 50 km) or be fully autonomous, performed according to a previously programmed route with the possibility of manual correction during the flight. The flight is extremely quiet due to the fact that the drone glides for most of the flight. On the other hand, the electric motor used to drive the drone, powered by lithium-polymer batteries, is characterized by quiet operation. Just before landing, the under-fuselage section with the observation head is jettisoned a dozen or so meters above the ground and safely descends with a parachute. The rest of the drone lands on its own by gliding into a designated spot.

== Operational history ==
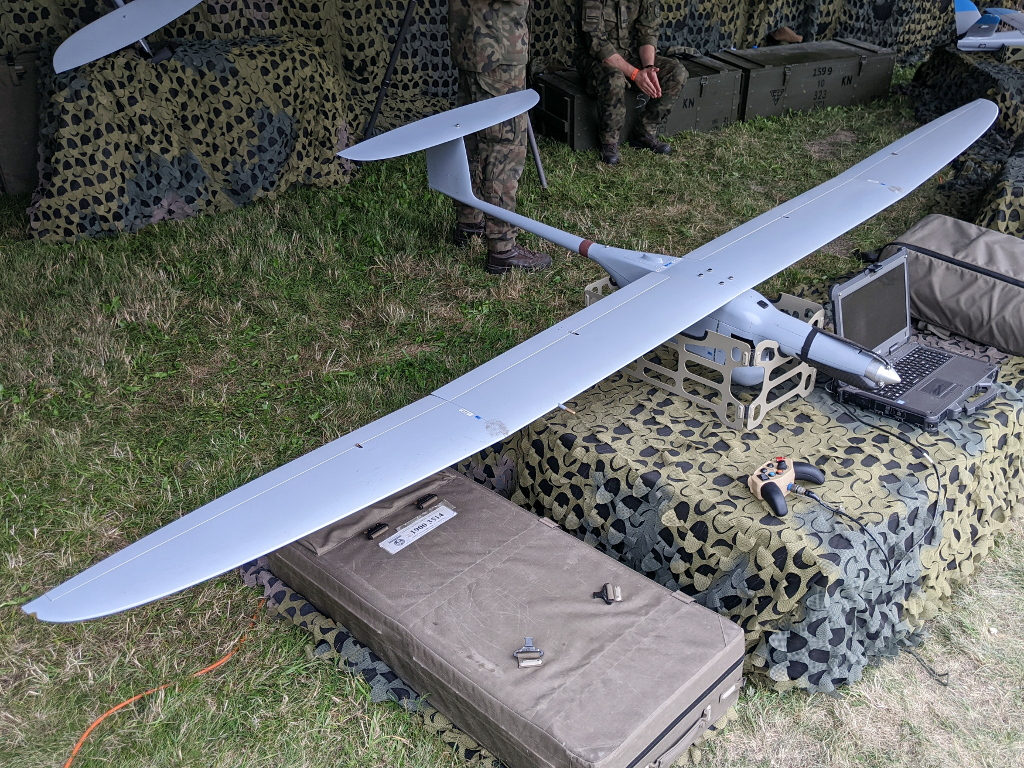
Polish Territorial Defence Force WB Electronics FlyEye, Radom Air show 2023

The drones were used operationally as part of the mission in Afghanistan by soldiers of the NiL Unit.

They have been used by Ukraine since March 2015 and used in combat in battles with separatists in the east of the country.

On June 7, 2022, the Federal Service of the National Guard of Russia released a video showing a downed FlyEye belonging to the Ukrainian Armed Forces. The photo is the first photographically documented case of the downing of this type of drone. The Polish manufacturer reported that during the ongoing military operations during the Russian invasion of Ukraine, Ukrainian FlyEyes perform about 250 flights per day. FlyEye is a small device, difficult to notice, with a low level of radar reflection. These features make the aircraft very difficult to shoot down. FlyEye is successfully used by the Ukrainian side to correct artillery fire, and was used on a massive scale in the Ukrainian-Russian war.

== Users ==
- Georgia
- Poland
- Malaysia
- Ukraine

== See also ==
- List of unmanned aerial vehicles
- WB Electronics Warmate
