= WB Electronics Warmate =

Polish loitering munition

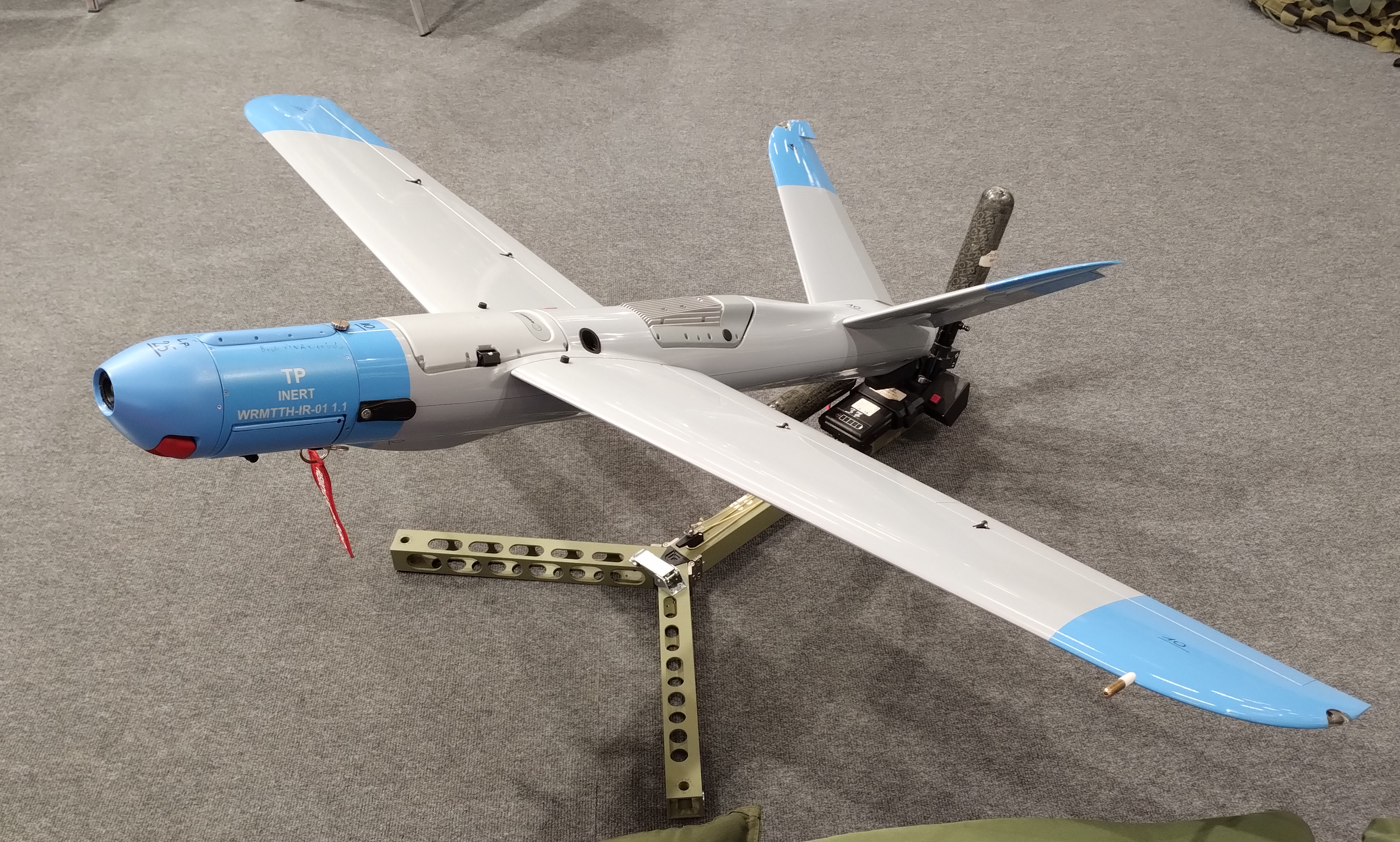
- Type: Loitering munition
- Place of origin: Poland

Service history
- Used by: See Operators
- Wars: Russian invasion of Ukraine; 2025 India–Pakistan strikes

Production history
- Manufacturer: WB Electronics
- Unit cost: $26,459.93 in 2017 (equivalent to $34,754 in 2025)
- Produced: 2016–current

Specifications
- Mass: Empty: 4 kg (8.8 lb); MTOW: 5.7 kg (13 lb) (Warmate), 30 kg (66 lb) (Warmate 2)
- Length: 1.1 m (3 ft 7 in)
- Width: 1.6 m (5 ft 3 in)
- Warhead: Warmate: Training, HE-FRAG with 300g of TNT or HEAT (penetration 200–240mm of RHA); Warmate 2: Training, HE-FRAG, thermobaric FAE or HEAT (penetration 400mm of RHA)
- Warhead weight: Warmate: 1.4 kg (3.1 lb); Warmate 2: 5 kg (11 lb)
- Engine: Electric motor
- Operational range: Warmate: 30 km (19 mi); Warmate 2: 30–240 km (19–149 mi)
- Flight ceiling: 9,800 ft (3,000 m) AMSL
- Flight altitude: Warmate: 150–300 m (490–980 ft) AGL; Warmate 2: 100–200 m (330–660 ft) AGL
- Maximum speed: Flight: 120 km/h (75 mph; 65 kn); Attack: 150 km/h (93 mph; 81 kn)
- Accuracy: 1.5 m (4 ft 11 in) CEP

WB Electronics Warmate is a class of loitering munition UAVs developed by the Polish defence contractor WB Group, having entered into the initial production in 2016.

== Design ==
The Warmate can be equipped with several different payloads, including fragmentation, HEAT and thermobaric warheads and has a swarming capability.

=== W2MPIR system ===
W2MPIR (Vampire; Polish: Wielowarstwowy System Przełamania A2AD/Powietrzny Inteligentny Rój, lit. 'Multi-Layered A2AD Penetration System/Aerial Smart Swarm') is a system designed to breach the enemy's anti-access/area denial (A2AD) defenses and provide a cost-effective strike/reconnaissance capability to fulfill the suppression of enemy air/missile defenses (SEAD) and electronic warfare (EW) missions.

The system consists of assorted interoperable WB Electronics UAVs operating in a swarm, including the Warmate 3.0 and/or Warmate 2 loitering munitions, together with the FlyEye and FT-5 Łoś multi-role reconnaissance platforms capable of identification, location, and jamming of electronic sensors and radars.

== Variants ==
=== Warmate-R ===
The Warmate-R is an intelligence, surveillance, and reconnaissance (ISR) version based on the same fuselage and ground segment.

It integrates 3 cameras to provide multiple views: an 8mm lens facing forward, and an 8mm and 12mm optics providing smooth tilting capabilities from a downward position (0 deg) to one side (90 deg).

It can be equipped with daylight or thermal cameras with remote pan and tilt, as well as a laser target designator. It has a "Target Lock" mode for tracking moving targets and enables accurate target location data.

=== Warmate-TL ===
The Warmate-TL (Tube Launch) is a variant that can be launched from man-portable or vehicle-mounted tubular launchers and can be integrated with multiple different platforms such as ground vehicles, helicopters, or warships.

=== "3.0" generation ===
The "3.0" generation of the Warmate system has been refined based on the inputs from customers and their combat experiences. The system is characterized by:

- 30 km (19 mi; 16 nmi) radio range with control handover support for a total operational range of 80 km (50 mi; 43 nmi),
- 70 minute flight endurance,
- Warheads designed for better firepower against high-value targets, incl. persons and reconnaissance, communications and EW systems,
- Quiet low-RPM engine that can be shut down during the engagement to avoid detection,
- Ability to fold the propeller blades in the final attack phase of flight,
- Ability to operate in all weather conditions,
- Extra control surfaces on the wings for improved maneuverability, and
- Integration with other WB Electronics systems such as the FlyEye mini reconnaissance drone or Topaz battle management system.

=== Warmate 2 ===
The Warmate 2 is a newer, larger, and heavier version of the original Warmate drone to be launched from elastomeric vehicle-mounted launchers.

This new model features an increased 30 kg (66 lb) maximum take-off weight and heavier 5 kg (11 lb) high-explosive-fragmentation (HE-FRAG), fuel-air explosive (FAE) and HEAT warheads designed to destroy armored vehicles, command outposts and other hardened targets. The HEAT warhead is capable of penetration of 400mm of RHA. The manufacturer promotes this variant as a viable alternative to anti-tank guided missiles, allowing for engagements at standoff distances, while also simplifying target acquisition. The rest of the warheads has a 40 m (130 ft) fragmentation (HE) or implosion (FAE) effect.

The radio range of Warmate 2 has been extended to 180 km (110 mi) for a total operational range of 30–240 km (19–149 mi), which translates to a 2 hour flight endurance. The flight altitude was lowered to 100–200 m (330–660 ft) for lower probability of intercept.

The flight control is fully automatic with waypoint navigation, and an automatic video tracker with EO and thermal IR cameras allowing for all-weather operations and night combat.

=== Warmate 8X ===
The Warmate 8X was unveiled at MSPO 2026. It follows an X-wing configuration, and is capable of carrying warheads of up to 8 kg, and is fitted with a gimballed camera housing, allowing it to conduct off-boresight target tracking.

Warmate 8X Specifications
| Warhead weight: | 8 kg |
| Warhead natures: | High-Explosive Dual-Purpose; HE-FRAG; Thermobaric |
| Maximum take-off weight: | ~40 kg |
| Flight Endurance: | ≥1 hour |
| Radio Line of Sight: | ~120 km |
| Operational Altitudes: | 100–1,000 m above ground level |
| Maximum Altitude: | 3,500 m above mean sea level |
| Cruising Speed: | ~150 km/h |
| Propulsion: | Pusher prop (electric) |

=== Warmate 30 ===
Warmate 30 was unveiled at MSPO 2026. This is a longer-range and stealthy model, following a 'flying wing' design, and is capable of carrying warheads weighing up to 30 kg.

Warmate 30 Specifications
| Warhead weight: | 30 kg |
| Warhead natures: | High-Explosive Dual-Purpose; Thermobaric |
| Maximum take-off weight: | ~100 kg |
| Flight Endurance: | ≥1 hour |
| Radio Line of Sight: | ~250 km |
| Operational Altitudes: | 100–1,500 m above ground level |
| Maximum Altitude: | 5,000 m above mean sea level |
| Cruising Speed: | ~150 km/h |
| Propulsion: | Turbojet, with rocket-assisted take-off |

== Deployment ==
The Warmate has been operated in various countries, notably participating in 2025 India–Pakistan strikes.

Ukraine has received several units of the Warmate drones as part of Poland's military assistance in the wake of the 2022 Russian invasion of Ukraine. This includes both the inter-government arms transfers and private fundraisers. Similar private fundraisers had been organized in other countries such as Lithuania, to support Ukraine in the ongoing conflict.

== Operators ==
=== Current operators ===
- NATO
  - Unspecified NATO member
- Poland
  - Polish Armed Forces
    - Polish Special Forces
    - Territorial Defence Force
- Ukraine
  - Armed Forces of Ukraine
- United Arab Emirates
  - Including Warmate 2
- Turkey
- India
  - 100 units
- Georgia
  - Produced domestically by Delta-WB LTD joint venture
- Libya
  - Libyan National Army
    - Acquired by the United Arab Emirates in 2020
- Unspecified Middle-Eastern operator.

=== Future operators ===
- South Korea
  - ROK Armed Forces
    - Ten sets with nearly two hundred Warmate 3 strike systems in combat and training variants ordered
- Romania
  - Romanian Armed Forces
    - A requirement for at least 70 'systems' was listed in Romania's SAFE programme document.

== Specifications ==
=== Warmate ===
- Length: 1.1 metres (3 ft 7 in)
- Wingspan: ~ 1.6 m (5 ft 3 in)
- Empty weight: 4 kilograms (8.8 lb)
- Payload weight: 1.4 kilograms (3.1 lb)
- Max take-off weight: 5.7 kilograms (12.6 lb)
- Cruise airspeed: 80 km/h (50 mph; 43 kn)
- Max horizontal speed: 120 km/h (75 mph; 65 kn)
- Max attack airspeed: 150 km/h (93 mph; 81 kn)
- Range: 30 kilometres (19 mi; 16 nmi)
- Endurance: 60 minutes
- Cruise altitude: 150 to 300 metres (500 to 1,000 ft) AGL
- Flight ceiling: 3,000 m (9,800 ft) AMSL
- Warhead: Training, HE-FRAG with 300g of TNT or HEAT (penetration 200–240mm against RHA)
- CEP: 1.5m
- Propulsion: Electric motor

Flight modes

- AUTO: follows a pre-programmed route.
- HOLD: orbits a point over the ground.
- FLY TO: fly to the selected point with a stable altitude.
- CRUISE: keep a particular altitude and flight direction, semi-manual control supported by autopilot in the camera direction.
- SEARCH: slow diving flight necessary for proper target selection.
- ATTACK: initiates the strike. The automated video tracker allows for a precise target hit even after the loss of communication.

=== Warmate R ===
- Range: 15 km (9.3 mi)
- Endurance: 80 minutes
- Weight: 5.2 kilograms (11 lb)
- Operation ceiling: 500 m (1,600 ft)
