= 12th Cavalry =

12th Cavalry may refer to:

== Divisions ==
- 12th Cavalry Division (Russian Empire)
- 12th Cavalry Division (Soviet Union)

== Brigades ==
- 12th Cavalry Brigade (British Indian Army)
- 12th Indian Cavalry Brigade

== Regiments ==
- 12th Bengal Cavalry, British Indian Army
- 12th Cavalry (Frontier Force), Pakistan
- 12th Cavalry Regiment (United States)
- 12th Reserve Cavalry Regiment, Britain

=== American Civil War regiments ===
==== Union Army ====
- 12th Illinois Cavalry Regiment
- 12th Indiana Cavalry Regiment
- 12th Kentucky Cavalry Regiment
- 12th Missouri Cavalry Regiment
- 12th Ohio Cavalry Regiment
- 12th Pennsylvania Cavalry Regiment
- 12th Tennessee Cavalry Regiment

==== Confederate Army ====
- 12th Arkansas Cavalry Regiment
- 12th Texas Cavalry Regiment
- 12th Virginia Cavalry Regiment

== Battalions ==
- 12th (Ayr and Lanark Yeomanry) Battalion, Royal Scots Fusiliers

== See also ==
- 12th Division (disambiguation)
- 12th Brigade (disambiguation)
- 12th Regiment (disambiguation)
- 12th (disambiguation)
