= Twelfth =

Twelfth can mean:

- The Twelfth Amendment to the United States Constitution
- The Twelfth, a Protestant celebration originating in Ireland
- Twelfth of the month, a recurring calendar date
- Twelfth grade, in education

== Mathematics ==
- 12th, an ordinal number; as in the item in an order twelve places from the beginning, following the eleventh and preceding the thirteenth
- 1/12th, a vulgar fraction, one part of a unit divided equally into twelve parts

== Music ==
- The note twelve scale degrees from the root (current note, in a chord)
- Twelfth (interval)

== Currency ==
- Uncia (coin), a Roman coin worth 12th of an As

== Geography ==
- 12th meridian east, a line of longitude
- 12th meridian west, a line of longitude
- 12th parallel north, a circle of latitude
- 12th parallel south, a circle of latitude
- 12th Avenue (disambiguation)
- 12th Street (disambiguation)

== Military ==
- 12th Army (disambiguation)
- 12th Battalion (disambiguation)
- 12th Brigade (disambiguation)
- 12th Division (disambiguation)
- 12th Regiment (disambiguation)
- 12th Squadron (disambiguation)

== See also ==
- 12 (number)
- 12th century
- 12th century BC
- Twelfth Amendment (disambiguation)
- Eleventh (disambiguation)
- Thirteenth (disambiguation)
