= 12th Group =

12th Group may refer to:

- No. 12 Group RAF, a unit of the United Kingdom Royal Air Force
- 12th Special Forces Group, a unit of the United States Army

== See also ==
- Twelfth Army (disambiguation)
- XII Corps (disambiguation)
- 12th Division (disambiguation)
- 12th Brigade (disambiguation)
- 12th Regiment (disambiguation)
- 12th Battalion (disambiguation)
- 12 Squadron (disambiguation)
