= 12th Wing =

12th Wing may refer to:

- CFB Shearwater (12 Wing Shearwater), a unit of the Canadian Air Force
- F 12 Kalmar, a unit of the Swedish Air Force
- 12th Flying Training Wing, a unit of the United States Air Force
- Ala 12, a unit of the Spanish Air and Space Force

== See also ==
- Twelfth Army (disambiguation)
- XII Corps (disambiguation)
- 12th Division (disambiguation)
- 12th Brigade (disambiguation)
- 12th Regiment (disambiguation)
- 12th Battalion (disambiguation)
- 12 Squadron (disambiguation)
