= 12th Rifle Division =

12th Rifle Division can refer to:

- 12th Rifle Division (Soviet Union)
- 12th Guards Rifle Division
- 12th Motor Rifle Division
- 12th Siberian Rifle Division

== See also ==
- 12th Division (disambiguation)
