= Territorial Defence Force (Poland) =

Military branch of the Polish Armed Forces

Territorial Defence Forces
- Wojska Obrony Terytorialnej
- Military eagle
- Founded: 1 January 2017
- Country: Poland
- Type: Light infantry
- Size: 40,000 (2025)
- Part of: Polish Armed Forces
- Mottos: Zawsze gotowi, zawsze blisko ("Always ready, always close")
- Website: Official website

Commanders
- Commander of the Territorial Defence Forces: Divisional General Krzysztof Stańczyk

Insignia
- Flag

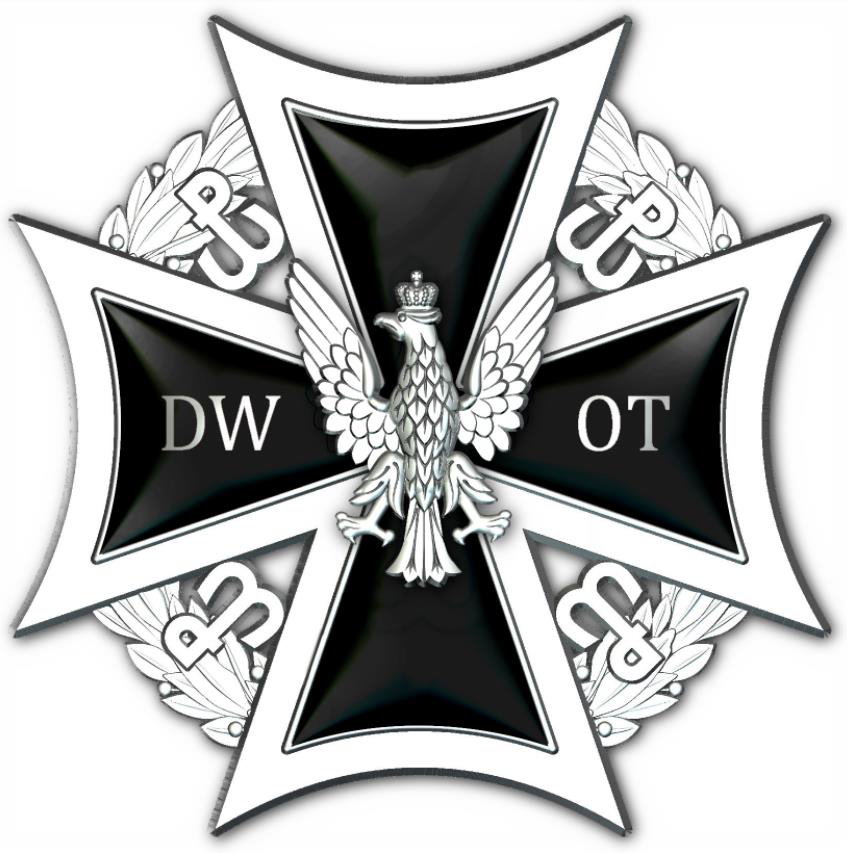
- Distinctive unit insignia of the TDF Command

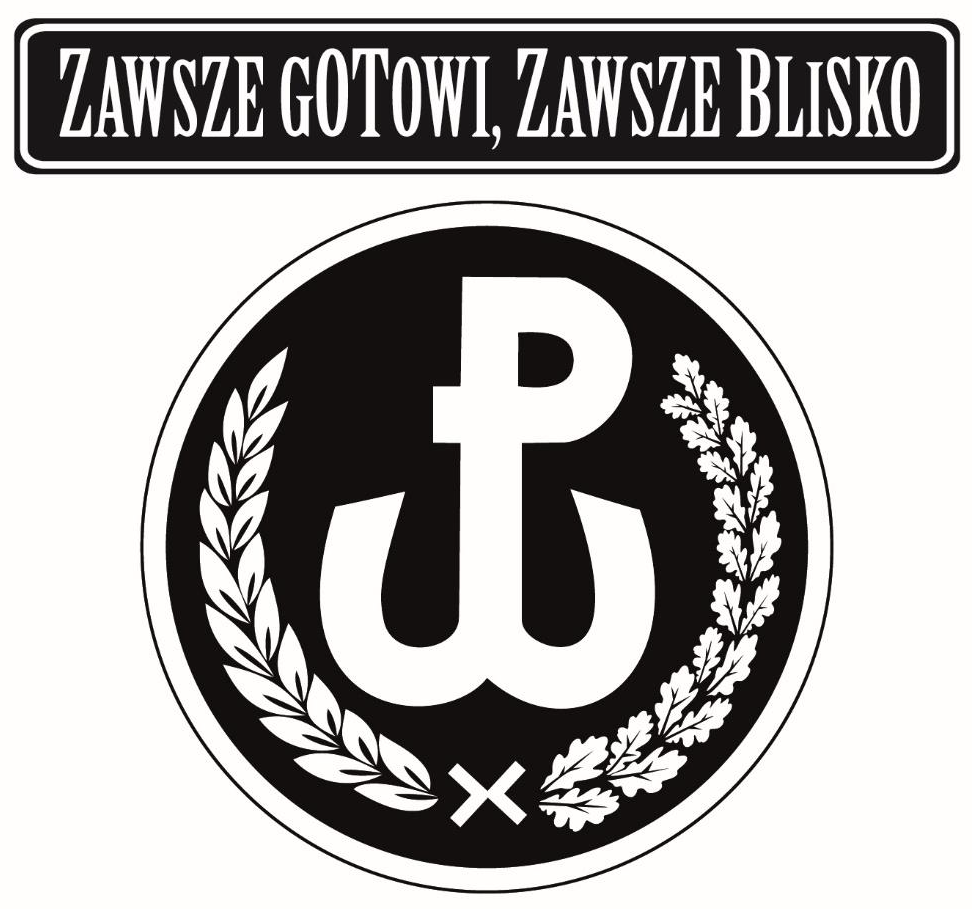
- Shoulder sleeve insignia (everyday uniform) of the TDF Command

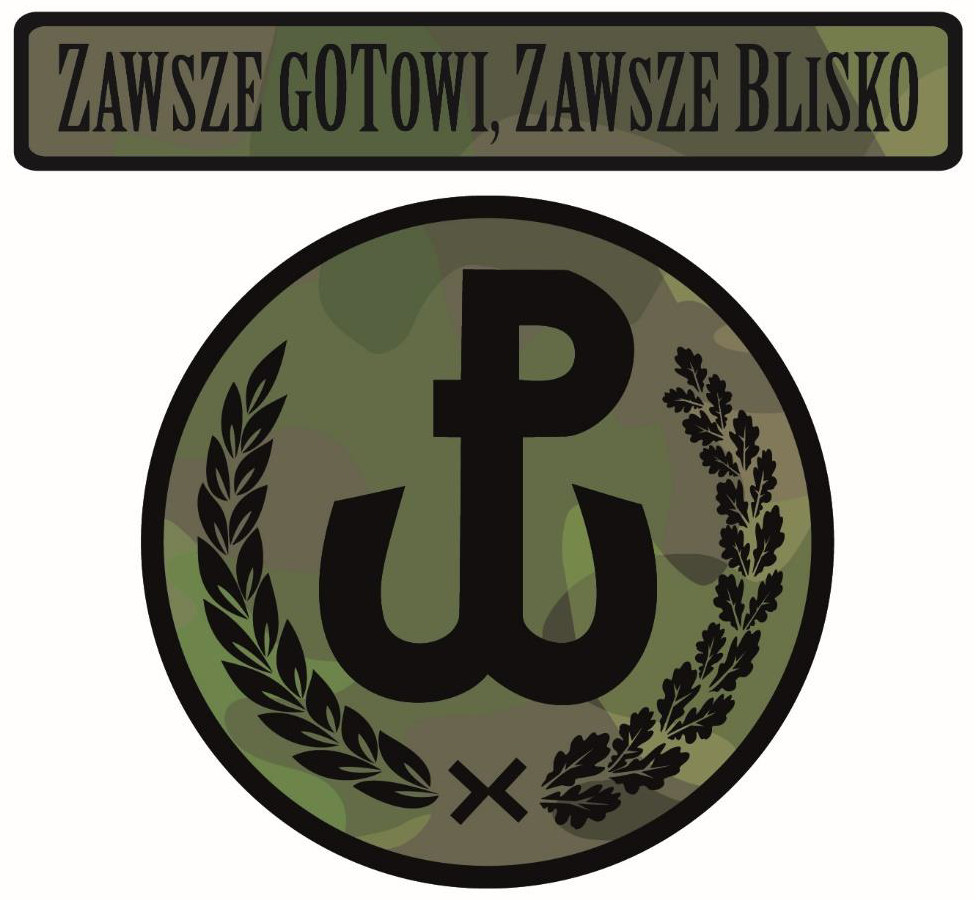
- Shoulder sleeve insignia (field uniform) of the TDF Command

The Territorial Defence Forces (TDF; Polish: Wojska Obrony Terytorialnej, WOT) are the volunteer home guard branch of the Polish Armed Forces. The force is made up of professional and part-time volunteer soldiers, forming part of the country's defence and deterrence system. Formed in 2016, it had reached 24,000 personnel by July 2019, and was slated to reach a size of around 53,000 personnel in 17 light infantry brigades by 2021. The creation of the Polish TDF relates to the reforms in the Baltic states' Territorial Defence Forces to provide response during the early stages of a hybrid conflict.

== History ==
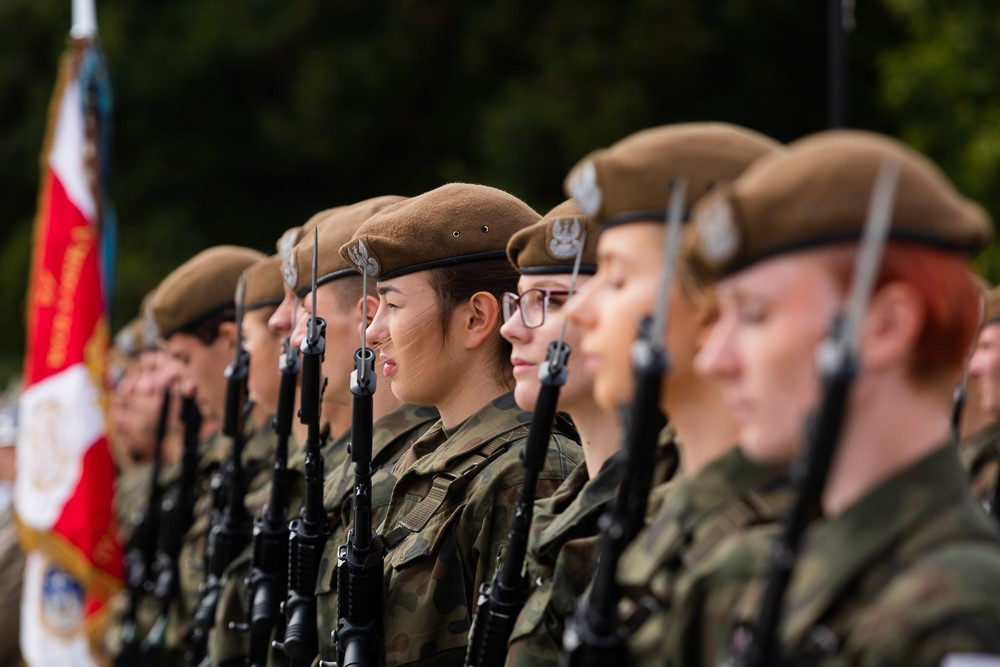
Soldiers of the Territorial Defence Force during a military ceremony in Warsaw, 2018

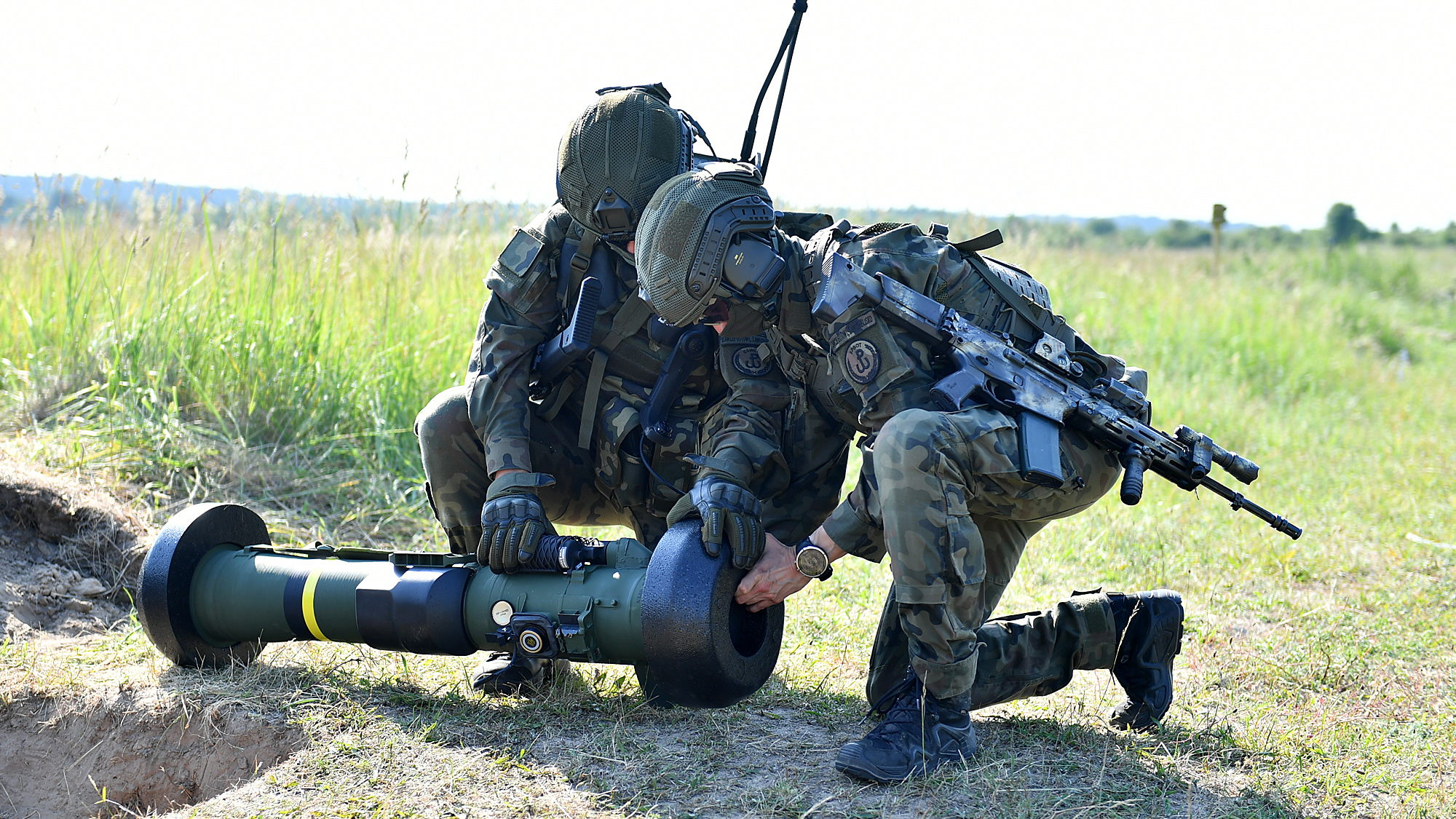
WOT soldiers equipped with the MSBS Grot rifles and Javelin anti-tank guided missile launcher

The Territorial Defence Force is a planned reserve component of Polish Armed Forces. A similar, identically named organization had existed in the country since 1965, but was disbanded in 2008 as part of a modernization program. The re-creation of the Territorial Defence Force was first announced in 2015 in reaction to the war in Donbas and concern that Poland's existing military would be ill-equipped to confront an adversary under similar conditions of low-intensity conflict. According to government officials, public reception to the idea was positive with 11,000 persons registering interest in joining the force within the first few months after the initial announcement. The program was subsequently formalized with the signing of "a new document concerning the functioning of the territorial defense concept" by Minister of Defence of Poland Antoni Macierewicz in a ceremony held at Warsaw's Waldemar Milewicz General Secondary School on 27 April 2016. The force was formally established on 1st of January, 2017.

On 21 May 2017 the first military oath in the history of WOT took place in Białystok, Lublin and Rzeszów.

On the basis of Decision No. 140 / MON of the Minister of National Defense of 28 June 2017, TDF was declared the successor to the traditions of the Home Army National Command (1942–1945) of the Second World War, while being the de facto successor to the heritage of its forebears.

== Organization ==
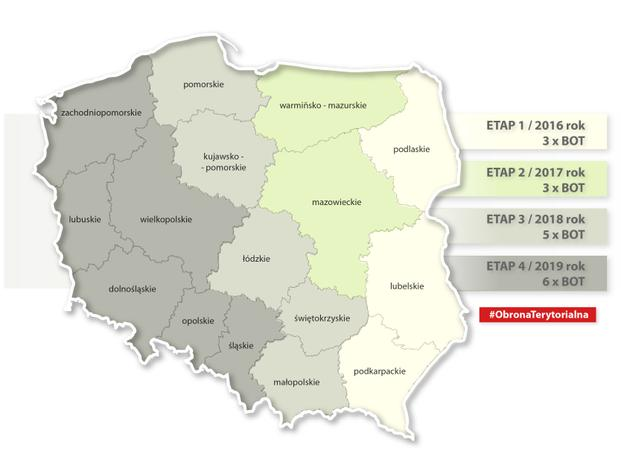
Schedule for the formation of the Territorial Defense Force

Plans announced in January 2016 called for what officials said would eventually become a 46,000-man contingent, though initially the WOT would consist of just three brigades sited in the north east of the country and funded with an annual appropriation of approximately €60 million; it was later reported the force would have a maximum size of 35,000 personnel. As envisaged, the Territorial Defence Force is to be a part-time, all-volunteer organization, with soldiers receiving 30 days of military training per year. Unlike existing reserve forces, which upon mobilization are integrated into regular components of the Polish military, the Territorial Defence Force will be designed to operate autonomously in home areas and with personnel drawn from the local population. According to Polish military planners, this set-up would be most effective in countering hybrid warfare. As part of the Ministry of Defense acquisition plans for 2017–2022, the total number of volunteers was set to 50,000 and a budget of 3.2 billion zloty outlaid to arm and equip them.

Besides responding to external military threats, the WOT will, according to the Defense Ministry, help strengthen Poland's "patriotic and Christian foundations".

Poland is divided into 16 Voivodeships. The Territorial Defence Troops follow the administrative division with a brigade formed in each voievodship. The exception is the Masovian, which has two territorial defence brigades due to the significance of the capital Warsaw. For mobilisation duties and liaison to the local authorities there is a Voievodship Military Staff in each of the 16 voievodships and the territorial brigades' HQs are located nearby. The commander of the Territorial Defence Troops is a general officer ranking major general and the brigades are commanded by colonels.

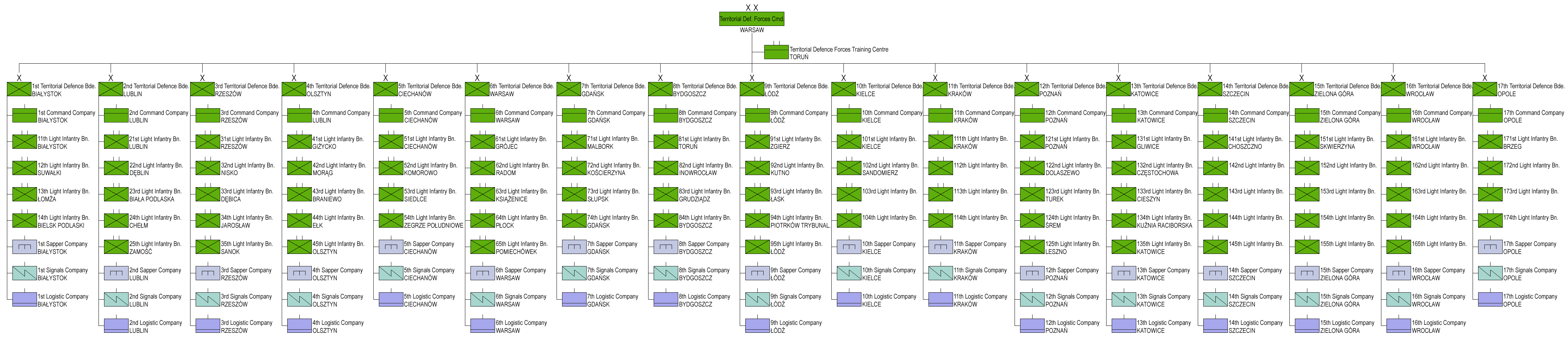
Planned end state of the Territorial Defence Force (click to enlarge)

- HQ in Warsaw
  - 2nd Lublin Territorial Defence Brigade "Maj. Hieronim Dekutowski „Zapora”" (2 Lubelska Brygada Obrony Terytorialnej im. mjr Hieronima Dekutowskiego ps."Zapora") in Lublin
    - 21st Light Infantry Battalion in Lublin
    - 22nd Light Infantry Battalion in Dęblin
    - 23rd Light Infantry Battalion in Bezwola
    - 24th Light Infantry Battalion in Chełm
    - 25th Light Infantry Battalion in Kraśnik
  - 3rd Podkarpacka Territorial Defence Brigade "Col. Łukasz Ciepliński „Pług”" (3 Podkarpacka Brygada Obrony Terytorialnej im. płk Łukasza Cieplińskiego ps."Pług") in Rzeszów
    - 3rd Command Company in Rzeszów
    - 3rd Sapper Company in Rzeszów
    - 3rd Support Company in Rzeszów
    - 3rd Logistical Company in Rzeszów
    - 31st Light Infantry Battalion in Rzeszów
    - 32nd Light Infantry Battalion in Nisko
    - 33rd Light Infantry Battalion in Dębica
    - 34th Light Infantry Battalion in Jarosław
    - 35th Light Infantry Battalion in Sanok
  - 5th Masovian Territorial Defence Brigade "1Lt. Mieczysław Dziemieszkiewicz „Rój”" (5 Mazowiecka Brygada Obrony Terytorialnej im. ppor. Mieczysława Dziemieszkiewcza ps."Rój") in Ciechanów (covering Northern Masovia)
    - 5th Command Company in Ciechanów
    - 5th Sapper Company in Ciechanów
    - 5th Support Company in Ciechanów
    - 5th Logistical Company in Ciechanów
    - 5th Training Company in Ciechanów
    - 51st Light Infantry Battalion in Ciechanów
    - 52nd Light Infantry Battalion in Komorowo
    - 53rd Light Infantry Battalion in Siedlce
    - 54th Light Infantry Battalion in Zegrze Południowe
    - Dowództwo Brygady – Ciechanów
  - 6th Masovian Territorial Defence Brigade "Rotmistrz Witold Pilecki" (6 Mazowiecka Brygada Obrony Terytorialnej im. rtm. Witolda Pileckiego) in Radom
    - 6th Command Company in Radom
    - 6th Sapper Company in Pomiechówek
    - 6th Logistical Company in Radom
    - 6th Training Company in Książenice
    - 61st Light Infantry Battalion in Książenice
    - 62nd Light Infantry Battalion in Radom
    - 63rd Light Infantry Battalion in Nowe Miasto nad Pilicą
    - 64th Light Infantry Battalion in Pomiechówek
  - 7th Pomeranian Territorial Defence Brigade "Naval Captain Adam Dedio" (7 Pomorska Brygada Obrony Terytorialnej im. kpt. mar. Adama Dedio) in Gdańsk - Wrzeszcz
    - 7th Command Company in Gdynia
    - 7th Sapper Company in Pruszcz Gdański
    - 7th Support Company in Gdynia
    - 7th Logistical Company in Gdynia
    - 7th Training Company in Pruszcz Gdański
    - 7th Medical Support Unit in Pruszcz Gdański
    - 71st Light Infantry Battalion in Malbork
    - 72nd Light Infantry Battalion in Kościerzyna
    - 73rd Light Infantry Battalion in Słupsk
  - 8th Kuyavian-Pomeranian Territorial Defence Brigade "Brig. Gen. Elżbieta Zawacka „Zo”" (8 Kujawsko-Pomorska Brygada Obrony Terytorialnej im. gen. bryg. Elżbiety Zawackiej ps."Zo") in Bydgoszcz
    - 8th Command Company in Bydgoszcz
    - 8th Sapper Company in Bydgoszcz
    - 8th Support Company in Bydgoszcz
    - 8th Logistical Company in Bydgoszcz
    - 81st Light Infantry Battalion in Toruń
    - 82nd Light Infantry Battalion in Inowrocław
    - 83rd Light Infantry Battalion in Grudziądz
    - 84th Light Infantry Battalion in Włocławek
  - 9th Łódź Territorial Defence Brigade "Brig. Gen. Stanisław Sojczyński „Warszyc”" (9 Łódzka Brygada Obrony Terytorialnej im. gen. bryg. Stanisława Sojczyńskiego ps."Warszyc") in Łódź
    - 9th Command Company in Łódź
    - 9th Sapper Company in Łódź
    - 9th Support Company in Łódź
    - 9th Logistical Company in Łódź
    - 91st Infantry Battalion in Zgierz
    - 92nd Light Infantry Battalion in Kutno
    - 93rd Light Infantry Battalion in Łask
    - 94th Light Infantry Battalion in Piotrków Trybunalski
  - 10th Świętokrzyska Territorial Defence Brigade "Maj. Eugeniusz Gedymin Kaszyński „Nurt”" (10 Świętokrzyska Brygada Obrony Terytorialnej im. mjr Eugeniusza Gedymina Kaszyńskiego ps."Nurt") in Kielce
    - 10th Command Company in Kielce
    - 10th Sapper Company in Kielce
    - 10th Support Company in Kielce
    - 10th Logistical Company in Kielce
    - 101st Light Infantry Battalion in Kielce
    - 102nd Light Infantry Battalion in Sandomierz
    - 103rd Light Infantry Battalion in Ostrowiec Świętokrzyski
  - 11th Lesser Poland Territorial Defence Brigade "Brig. Gen. Leopold Okulicki „Niedźwiadek”" (11 Małopolska Brygada Obrony Terytorialnej im. gen. bryg. Leopolda Okulickiego ps. "Niedźwiadek") in Kraków
    - 11th Command company in Rząska
    - 11th Sapper company in Rząska
    - 11th Logistic company in Oświęcim
    - 11th Training company in Rząska
    - Contamination Analysis Center in Rząska
    - Medical support group in Rząska
    - 111th Light Infantry Battalion in Rząska
    - 112th Light Infantry Battalion in Oświęcim
    - 113th Light Infantry Battalion in Tarnów
    - 114th Light Infantry Battalion in Limanowa
  - 12th Greater Poland Territorial Defence Brigade "Brig. Gen. Stanisław Taczak" (12 Wielkopolska Brygada Obrony Terytorialnej im. gen. bryg. Stanisława Taczaka) in Poznań
    - 12th Command Company in Poznań
    - 12th Sapper Company in Poznań
    - 12th Support Company in Poznań
    - 12th Logistical Company in Poznań
    - 122nd Light Infantry Battalion in Dolaszewo
    - 123rd Light Infantry Battalion in Turek
    - 124th Light Infantry Battalion in Śrem
    - 125th Light Infantry Battalion in Leszno
  - 13th Silesian Territorial Defence Brigade "Lt. Col. Tadeusz Puszczyński „Konrad Wawelberg”" (13 Śląska Brygada Obrony Terytorialnej im. ppłk Tadeusza Puszczyńskiego ps."Konrad Wawelberg") in Katowice
    - 13th Command Company in Katowice
    - 13th Sapper Company in Katowice
    - 13th Support Company in Katowice
    - 13th Logistical Company in Katowice
    - 131st Light Infantry Battalion in Gliwice
    - 132nd Light Infantry Battalion in Częstochowa
    - 133rd Light Infantry Battalion in Cieszyn
  - 14th West Pomeranian Territorial Defence Brigade "Lt. Col. Stanisław Jerzy Sędziak „Warta”" (14 Zachodniopomorska Brygada Obrony Terytorialnej im. ppłk dypl. Stanisława Jerzego Sędziaka ps. "Warta") in Szczecin
    - 14th Command Company in Szczecin
    - 14th Sapper Company in Szczecin
    - 14th Support Company in Szczecin
    - 14th Logistical Company in Szczecin
    - 141st Light Infantry Battalion in Choszczno
    - 142nd Light Infantry Battalion in Trzebiatów
    - 143rd Light Infantry Battalion in Wałcz
  - 15th Lubusz Territorial Defence Brigade "Div. Gen. Franciszek Kamiński „Olsza”" (15 Lubuska Brygada Obrony Terytorialnej im. gen. dyw. Franciszka Kamińskiego ps. "Olsza") in Skwierzyna
    - 15th Command Company in Skwierzyna
    - 15th Sapper Company in Skwierzyna
    - 15th Support Company in Skwierzyna
    - 15th Logistical Company in Skwierzyna
    - 151st Light Infantry Battalion in Skwierzyna
    - 152nd Light Infantry Battalion in Krosno Odrzańskie
  - 16th Lower Silesian Territorial Defence Brigade "Lt. Col. Ludwik Marszałek „Zbroj”" (16 Dolnośląska Brygada Obrony Terytorialnej im. ppłk. Ludwika Marszałka ps."Zbroja") in Wrocław
    - 16th Command Company in Wrocław
    - 16th Sapper Company in Wrocław
    - 16th Support Company in Wrocław
    - 16th Logistical Company in Wrocław
    - 161st Light Infantry Battalion in Wrocław
    - 162nd Light Infantry Battalion in Głogów
    - 163rd Light Infantry Battalion in Wałbrzych
  - 17th Opole Territorial Defence Brigade (17 Opolska Brygada Obrony Terytorialnej) in Opole
    - 17th Command Company in Opole
    - 17th Sapper Company in Opole
    - 17th Support Company in Opole
    - 17th Logistical Company in Opole
    - 171st Light Infantry Battalion in Brzeg
    - 172nd Light Infantry Battalion in Opole
  - 18th Capital Territorial Defence Brigade "Gen. Antoni Chruściel „Monter”" (18 Stołeczna Brygada Obrony Terytorialnej im. gen. Antoniego Chruściela ps. „Monter”) in Warsaw
    - 18th Command Company in Warszawa - Rembertów
    - 18th Sapper Company in Warsaw - Rembertów
    - 18th Support Company in Warsaw - Rembertów
    - 18th Logistical Company in Warsaw - Rembertów
    - 18th Training Company in Warsaw - Rembertów
    - 181st Light Infantry Battalion in Warsaw-Rembertów
    - 182nd Light Infantry Battalion in Warsaw-Ursynów
    - 183rd Light Infantry Battalion in Borzęcin Duży
  - Honour Guard Unit of the TDF (Ośrodek Reprezentacyjny Wojsk Obrony Terytorialnej) in Radom
  - Training Center of the TDF "Capt. Eugeniusz Konopacki" (Centrum Szkolenia Wojsk Obrony Terytorialnej im. kpt. Eugeniusza Konopackiego) in Toruń
  - Signals and Informatics Training Center "Brig. Gen. Heliodor Cep" (Centrum Szkolenia Łączności i Informatyki im. gen. bryg. Heliodora Cepy) in Zegrze
  - NCO School SONDA (Szkoła Podoficerska SONDA) in Zegrze and Toruń

Each brigade also has a command, a support, a sapper and a logistic company, carrying the brigade's number.

=== Border Defence Component ===
The Polish Ministry of National Defence has formed a Border Defence Component (WOT Komponent Obrony Pogranicza) under the Territorial Defence Force. The component will be composed of four brigades and will carry the traditions and has the same abbreviation as the Border Protection Corps of the Second Polish Republic. The western and southern land borders and the border with Eastern Prussia and the Free City of Danzig were guarded by the civilian Straż Graniczna under the Ministry of Finance. The border with the Soviet Union was guarded by the Border Protection Corps. The newly established Border Defence Component will be tasked with the military security of Poland's northeastern and eastern borders and will cooperate with the modern Polish Border Guard. It will reach initial operational capability in 2028 and full operational capability is expected in 2032.

Border Defence Component of the TDF (WOT Komponent Obrony Pogranicza)

- 1st Podlaska Territorial Defence Brigade "Col. Władysław Liniarski „Mścisław”" (1 Podlaska Brygada Obrony Terytorialnej im. płk Władysława Liniarskiego ps."Mścisław") in Białystok
  - 11th Light Infantry Battalion in Białystok
  - 12th Border Defence Battalion in Suwałki
  - 13th Light Infantry Battalion in Łomża
  - 14th Border Defence Battalion in Hajnówka
  - 15th Light Infantry Battalion in Dąbrowa-Moczydły
- 4th Warmian-Masurian Territorial Defence Brigade "Capt. Gracjan Klaudiusz Fróg „Szczerbiec”" (4 Warmińsko-Mazurska Brygada Obrony Terytorialnej im. kpt. Gracjana Klaudiusza Fróga ps."Szczerbiec") in Olsztyn
  - 41st Border Defence Battalion in Giżycko
  - 42nd Light Infantry Battalion in Morąg
  - 43rd Border Defence Battalion in Braniewo
  - 44th Light Infantry Battalion in Ełk
  - 45th Light Infantry Battalion in Olsztyn
- 19th Upper Bug Territorial Defence Brigade "Brig. Gen. Wilhelm Orlik-Rückemann" (19 Nadbużańska Brygada Obrony Terytorialnej im. gen. bryg. Wilhelma Orlik-Rückemanna) in Chełm
  - 191st Border Defence Battalion in Wola Uhruska
  - 192nd Border Defence Battalion – Hrubieszów
  - 193rd Border Defence Battalion – Biała Podlaska
  - 194th Logistical Battalion in Wola Uhruska
- 20th Przemyśl Territorial Defence Brigade (20 Przemyska Brygada Obrony Terytorialnej im. gen. dyw. Stefana Roweckiego, ps. „Grot”) in Przemyśl
  - 201st Border Defence Battalion in Przemyśl
  - 202nd Light Infantry Battalion in Jarosław
  - 203rd Border Defence Battalion in Sanok
  - 204th Logistical Battalion in Przemyśl

== Tasks ==
The Territorial Defense Forces are dedicated to:

- Conducting defense activities in cooperation with the Operational Forces and supporting elements of the non-military system.
- Carrying out unconventional activities, anti-sabotage and offensive landing.
- Participate in safeguarding the reception and development of allied reinforcement forces in commanded areas.
- Implementation of projects in the area of: crisis management, the eradication of natural disasters and the elimination of their effects, property protection, search and rescue operations.
- maintaining universal readiness to defend the Republic of Poland.
- Cooperating with elements of the state's defense system.
- Shaping attitudes and values in society.

== See also ==
- List of equipment of Polish Territorial Defense Forces
- Polish Land Forces
- Lithuanian National Defence Volunteer Forces
- Territorial Defense Forces (Ukraine)
- Home Guard
