= Twelfth Army =

Twelfth Army or 12th Army may refer to:

== Germany ==
- 12th Army (German Empire), a unit in World War I
- 12th Army (Wehrmacht), a unit in World War II

== Russia/Soviet Union ==
- 12th Army (Russian Empire), a unit in World War I
- 12th Army (RSFSR), a Red Army unit in the Russian Civil War
- 12th Army (Soviet Union), a unit of the Soviet Army
- 12th Air Army
- 12th Independent Air Defense Army

== Other countries ==
- 12th Army (Austria-Hungary), a unit in World War I
- 12th Army (Italy), a unit in World War I
- Twelfth Army (Japan), a unit of the Imperial Japanese Army
- Twelfth Area Army, Japan
- Twelfth Army (United Kingdom), a unit of the British Army

== See also ==
- List of armies by number
- XII Corps (disambiguation)
- 12th Division (disambiguation)
- 12th Brigade (disambiguation)
- 12th Regiment (disambiguation)
- 12th Battalion (disambiguation)
- 12th Wing (disambiguation)
- 12th Squadron (disambiguation)
- 12th (disambiguation)
