= XII Corps =

12th Corps, Twelfth Corps, or XII Corps may refer to:

== France ==
- 12th Army Corps (France)
- XII Corps (Grande Armée), a corps of the Imperial French Army during the Napoleonic Wars

== Germany ==
=== German Empire ===
- XII (1st Royal Saxon) Corps, a unit of the Imperial German Army
- XII (Royal Saxon) Reserve Corps, a unit of the Imperial German Army

=== Nazy Germany ===
- 12th Air Corps, Luftwaffe, Wehrmacht
- XII Army Corps (Wehrmacht)
- XII SS Corps, Waffen-SS

== Russia and Soviet Union ==
=== Russian Empire ===
- 12th Army Corps (Russian Empire)

=== Soviet Union ===
- 12th Guards Rifle Corps
- 12th Guards Tank Corps
- 12th Mechanized Corps
- 12th Rifle Corps

== United Kingdom ==
- XII Corps (United Kingdom)

=== Artillery Volunteer Corps ===
- 12th (Inveraray) Argyllshire Artillery Volunteer Corps
- 12th (Marazion) Cornwall Artillery Volunteer Corps
- 12th (Devonport Dockyard) Devonshire Artillery Volunteer Corps
- 12th (Western) Lanarkshire Artillery Volunteer Corps

=== Rifle Volunteer Corps ===
- 12th (Forest of Dean) Gloucestershire Rifle Volunteer Corps
- 12th Kent (Dartford) Rifle Volunteer Corps
- 12th (North Eastern) Lanarkshire Rifle Volunteer Corps
- 12th (2nd Preston) Lancashire Rifle Volunteer Corps
- 12th (Barton) Lincolnshire Rifle Volunteer Corps
- 12th Middlesex (Civil Service) Rifle Volunteer Corps
- 12th (Westbourne) Sussex Rifle Volunteer Corps
- 12th (Stoke Newington) Tower Hamlets Rifle Volunteer Corps

== United States ==
- XII Corps (United States)
- XII Corps (Union Army), a unit in the American Civil War

== Other countries ==
- 12th Corps (People's Republic of China)
- XII Corps (India)
- XII Army Corps (Italy)
- XII Corps (North Korea)
- XII Corps (Ottoman Empire)
- XII Corps (Pakistan)
- XII Army Corps (Spain)
- 12th Army Corps (Ukraine)
- 12th Corps (Vietnam)
- 12th Corps (Yugoslav Partisans)

== See also ==
- List of military corps by number
- 12th Army (disambiguation)
- 12th Battalion (disambiguation)
- 12th Brigade (disambiguation)
- 12th Division (disambiguation)
- 12th Group (disambiguation)
- 12th Regiment (disambiguation)
- 12th Squadron (disambiguation)
- 12th (disambiguation)
