= 5th Tank Brigade =

5th Tank Brigade may refer to:

- 5th Guards Tank Brigade, a Russian military unit
- 5th Tank Brigade (Ukraine), a Ukrainian military unit
- 138th Separate Tank Regiment, a Soviet military unit known as the 5th Separate Tank Brigade from 1962 to 1980
