= 12th Mechanised Division =

12th Mechanised Division may refer to:

- 12th Mechanized Infantry Division (Greece)
- 12th Mechanised Division (Poland)
- 12th Guards Mechanized Division, Soviet Union

== See also ==
- 12th Division (disambiguation)
