= 12th Battalion =

12th Battalion may refer to:

- 12th Battalion (Australia), a unit of the Australian Army
- 12th Battalion, Canadian Expeditionary Forces, a unit of the Canadian Army
- 12 (Vancouver) Service Battalion, a unit of the Canadian Army
- 12th Philippine Scout Battalion, a unit of the Philippine Army
- The United Kingdom Army unit 12th Battalion, Durham Light Infantry

== See also ==
- Twelfth Army (disambiguation)
- XII Corps (disambiguation)
- 12th Division (disambiguation)
- 12th Brigade (disambiguation)
- 12th Regiment (disambiguation)
- 12th Group (disambiguation)
- 12 Squadron (disambiguation)
