= 12th Division =

12th Division may refer to:

== Infantry divisions ==
- 12th Division (Australia)
- 12th Infantry Division (Belgium)
- 12th Infantry Division (France)
- 12th Division (German Empire)
- 12th Landwehr Division, German Empire
- 12th Reserve Division, German Empire, a unit of the Imperial German Army in World War I
- 12th Infantry Division (Wehrmacht), a German military unit that fought during World War II
- 12th Luftwaffe Field Division, Wehrmacht
- 12th Mechanized Infantry Division (Greece), a Greek unit based at Alexandroupoli, Thrace
- 12th Infantry Division "Sassari" (Kingdom of Italy)
- 12th Indian Division, British Indian Army during World War I
- 12th Infantry Division (India)
- 12th Division (Iraq)
- 12th Division (Imperial Japanese Army), was an infantry division in the Imperial Japanese Army
- 12th Division (North Korea), was a division of the Korean People's Army
- 12th Infantry Division (Pakistan), is a Pakistani Army infantry division currently based in Murree, Punjab
- 12th Mechanised Division (Poland), was a tactical unit of the Polish Army in the interbellum period
- 12th Guards Airborne Division, Soviet Union
- 12th Rifle Division (Soviet Union), was a military formation of the Red Army during World War II
- 12th Guards Mechanized Division, Soviet Union
- 12th Guards Rifle Division, Soviet Union
- 12th Motor Rifle Division, Soviet Union
- 12th Infantry Division (Russian Empire)
- 12th Siberian Rifle Division, Russian Empire
- 12th (Eastern) Division, was a division raised by the British Army during the First World War
- 12th (Eastern) Infantry Division, was a division raised by the British Army during the Second World War
- 12th Infantry Division (South Korea), infantry division of the South Korea Army
- 12th Division (United States), infantry division of the United States Army, active in 1918–1919
- Philippine Division (United States), also designated as the US 12th Infantry Division

== Armoured divisions ==
- 12th Panzer Division (Bundeswehr)
- 12th Panzer Division (Wehrmacht)
- 12th SS Panzer Division Hitlerjugend (Germany)
- 12th Guards Tank Division, Soviet Union
- 12th Armored Division (United States)

== Aviation divisions ==
- 12th Fighter Aviation Division, People's Republic of China
- 12th Military Transport Aviation Division, Soviet Union/Russia
- 12th Air Division, United States

== Other divisions ==
- 12th Coastal Defense Division, People's Republic of China
- 12th Public Security Division, People's Republic of China
- 12th Flak Division, Germany
- 12th Cavalry Division (Russian Empire)
- 12th Breakthrough Artillery Division, Soviet Union
- 12th Anti-Aircraft Division, United Kingdom

== See also ==
- Twelfth Army (disambiguation)
- XII Corps (disambiguation)
- 12th Brigade (disambiguation)
- 12th Regiment (disambiguation)
- 12th Wing (disambiguation)
- 12 Squadron (disambiguation)
