= Twelfth of the month =

Recurring ordinal calendar date

The twelfth of the month or twelfth day of the month is the recurring calendar date position corresponding to the day numbered 12 of each month. In the Gregorian calendar (and other calendars that number days sequentially within a month), this day occurs in every month of the year, and therefore occurs twelve times per year.

- Twelfth of January
- Twelfth of February
- Twelfth of March
- Twelfth of April
- Twelfth of May
- Twelfth of June
- Twelfth of July
- Twelfth of August
- Twelfth of September
- Twelfth of October
- Twelfth of November
- Twelfth of December

In addition to these dates, this date occurs in months of many other calendars, such as the Bengali calendar and the Hebrew calendar.

== See also ==
- Twelfth (disambiguation)
