= 1st Podlaska Territorial Defence Brigade =

- 1 Podlaska Brygada Obrony Terytorialnej
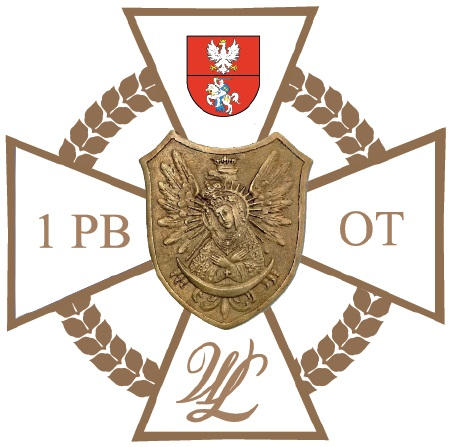
- Distinctive unit insignia
- Active: 2016 – present
- Country: Poland
- Allegiance: Polish Armed Forces
- Branch: Territorial Defence Force
- Type: Military reserve force
- Role: Infantry
- Garrison/HQ: Białystok
- Patron: Władysław Liniarski

Commanders
- Pułkownik: Mieczysław Gurgielewicz

Insignia
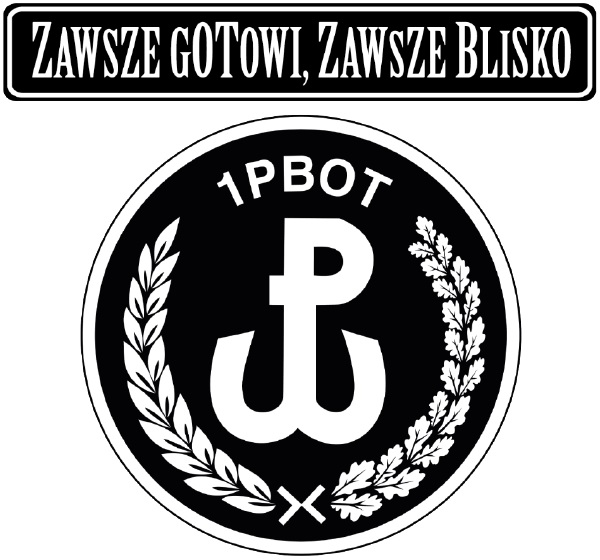
- Shoulder sleeve insignia (everyday uniform)

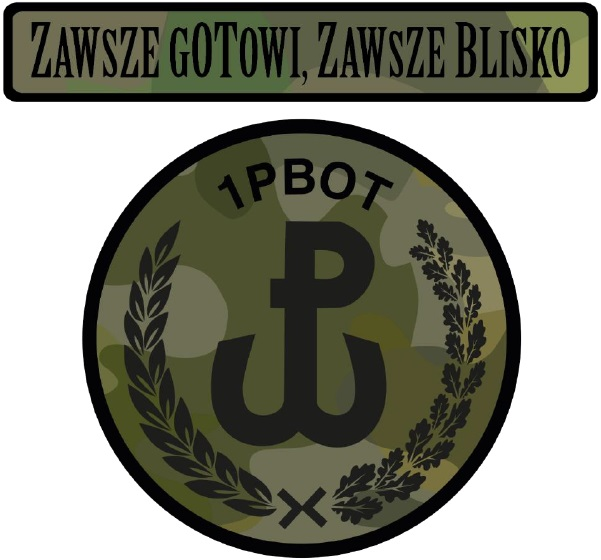
- Shoulder sleeve insignia (field uniform)

1st Podlaska Territorial Defence Brigade named after Brig. Gen. Władysław Liniarski, pseudonym "Mścisław" (1 PBOT) (Polish: 1 Podlaska Brygada Obrony Terytorialnej im. gen.bryg. Władysława Liniarskiego, ps. „Mścisław”) is a tactical unit of the Territorial Defense Forces of the Polish Armed Forces. It is headquartered in Białystok.

== Structure (as of 2017) ==
- Brigade command - Białystok
- 11th Light Infantry Battalion - Białystok - barracks at Kawaleryjska 70 street (former 25th bot of JW 4861)
- 12th Light Infantry Battalion - Suwałki - barracks at Wojska Polskiego 21 street
- 13th Light Infantry Battalion - Łomża - barracks at Al. Legionów 133
- 14th Light Infantry Battalion – Bielsk Podlaski (ul. Dubiażyńskiej 2) and Hajnówka
- (5) 53rd Light Infantry Battalion – Siedlce (JW 4862)

== Traditions ==
By decision no. 49/MON of the Minister of National Defence of 1 March 2017, the brigade took over and honourably cultivates the traditions of

The combat units of the Citizens' Home Army:

- Guerrilla Unit of the Citizens' Home Army of Capt. Kazimierz Kamieński, alias "Huzar" (1945–1947),
- 5th Vilnius Brigade of the Home Army of Maj. Zygmunt Szendzielarz, alias "Łupaszka" (1945–1947),
- 6th Vilnius Brigade of the Home Army of Lt. Lucjan Minkiewicz, alias "Wiktor", Capt. Władysław Łukasiuk, alias "Młot", Capt. Kazimierz Kamieński, alias "Huzar" (1946–1952),

Combat units subordinate to the Białystok Inspectorate of the Home Army:

- 42nd Infantry Regiment

== Commanders ==
- Pulkovnik Sławomir Kocanowski (2016 - 2022)
- Pulkovnik Mieczysław Gurgielewicz (2022 - incumbent)
