= No. 92 Squadron RSAF =

- Official Squadron Badge of No. 92 Squadron RSAF
- Active: Unknown-present
- Country: Saudi Arabia
- Branch: Royal Saudi Air Force
- Type: Squadron
- Role: Close Air Support
- Part of: RSAF 15 Wing
- Base: King Saud Air Base, Hafar al-Batin
- Aircraft: McDonnell Douglas F-15S Strike Eagle; McDonnell Douglas F-15SA Strike Eagle

No. 92 Squadron RSAF is a squadron of the Royal Saudi Air Force that operates the McDonnell Douglas F-15S Strike Eagle & F-15SA from King Saud Air Base, Hafar al-Batin, Eastern Province in Saudi Arabia within RSAF 15 Wing.

During May the unit took part in Exercise Iniochos 23 at Andravida, Greece.

The unit was previously at King Abdulaziz Air Base, Dhahran.
