= 12th Street =

12th Street may refer to:

== Roads ==
- 12th Street (Chicago), now Roosevelt Road
- 12th Street (Erie, Pennsylvania)
- 12th Street (Manhattan)
- 12th Street (St. Louis)
- 12th Street (Washington, D.C.)
- Kingsway (Vancouver), which becomes 12th Street at its southeast end
- New Jersey Route 54, known locally as 12th Street

== Transit ==
- 12th Street (GRTC BRT station)
- 12th Street station (DART), in Dallas, Texas, USA
- 12th Street/Jefferson and 12th Street/Washington stations, Valley Metro Rail stations in Phoenix, Arizona, USA
- 12th Street Oakland City Center station, a BART station in Oakland, California, USA

== See also ==
- 12th Avenue (disambiguation)
