= Grigory Stelmakh =

Soviet military commander (1900–1942)

- Born: 1900; Mykolaiv, Ukraine
- Died: 31 December 1942 (aged 42); Kalach-on-Don, Soviet Union
- Military career
- Allegiance: Soviet Union
- Branch: Red Army
- Service years: 1919–1942
- Rank: Major General
- Commands: 12th Rifle Division; Southwestern Front (Chief of Staff); Volkhov Front (Chief of Staff)
- Conflicts: Russian Civil War; Battle of Tikhvin; Battle of Stalingrad

Grigory Stelmakh (1900 – 31 December 1942) was a Soviet military commander. He held a prominent role in the defeat of German blitzkrieg (Operation Barbarossa) and in the Soviet victory in the battle of Stalingrad.

== Before World War II ==
Stelmakh was born in Mykolaiv, Ukraine into a Jewish family. Like most of his generation, he was captivated by the Bolshevik's promise of a better society. In 1919, Stelmakh volunteered to the Red Army. He fought in the Russian Civil War, was admitted to the school for infantry commanders (1921), and stayed in the army. In 1926 he graduated from the Frunze Military Academy. His rise was rapid: chief of staff of rifle division (1926–1931), Chief of Staff of the Soviet forces in Far East, known as the Special Red Banner Far Eastern Army (OKDVA) (1932–1935), commander of the 12th Rifle division (1935–1938).

Stelmakh was arrested and imprisoned (1938–1940). He was exonerated, released and promoted to Major-General. Due to the Red Army's need to prepare a new generation of senior commanders, Stelmakh, among other skilled Red Army officers, was sent to teach as a senior instructor in the Frunze Military Academy (1940–1941).

== Battle of Tikhvin ==
Steelmakh fought the German "blitzkrieg" in the north. He joined the battle of Tikhvin as the Chief of Staff of the 4th Field Army. In the midst of the battle Stavka ordered the Commander of the 4th Field Army Kirill Meretskov and Stelmakh to organize a new Volkhov Front. Stelmakh became the Front's Chief of Staff. By December 30, 1941 Meretskov and Stelmakh expelled Leeb's troops back to positions from which they began their Tikhvin offense. After Tikhvin, Stelmakh served as Chief of Staff of Volkhov Group of Forces and the Leningrad Front.

== Battle of Stalingrad ==
In October 1942, whilst the Red Army was preparing for counter-offensive in the battle of Stalingrad, Stelmakh was appointed Chief of Staff of the new Southwestern Front commanded by Nikolai Vatutin. Stelmakh was among major planners and commanders of the battle. Vatutin and Stelmakh planned Operation Saturn to expand the Soviet offense westward to defeat German forces east of Rostov-on-Don. They intended, acting together with Rokossovsky, to trap German armies retreating from the Caucasus. After the war, military analysts assessed this plan as realistic and claimed that its execution could have speeded up Germany's downfall. Stavka considered Vatutin and Stelmakh's proposal too daring, and ordered the Southwestern Front to limit the scope of the offence to defeating the German relief effort. Stelmakh planned Operation Little Saturn. While Rodion Malinovsky's Soviet Second Guards Army defeated major German relief forces, Vatutin and Stelmakh, with the support of units from the Voronezh Front, surrounded the Italian 8th Army, reinforced by German and other Axis divisions. The Red Army killed almost 21,000 enemy troops and took more than 64,000 prisoners.

Stelmakh was killed in December 1942, on the front line when his troops were capturing a stronghold in Kalach-on-Don.
