= Adam Dedio =

Polish resistance member

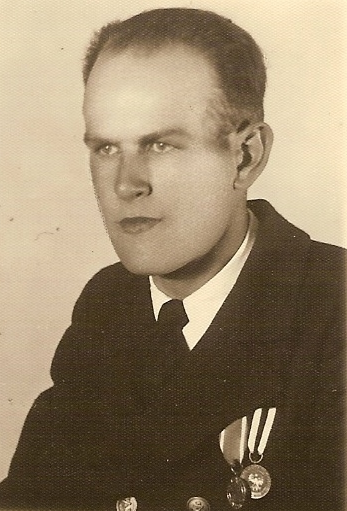
- Lieutenant Adam Dedio
- Born: 24 December 1918; Zakopane, Poland
- Died: 14 April 1947 (aged 28); Gdańsk, Poland
- Military career
- Allegiance: Poland
- Branch: Polish Navy Poland
- Service years: 1937–1947
- Rank: Lieutenant
- Commands: ORP "Bystry"
- Conflicts: World War II

Adam Dedio (24 December 1918 – 14 April 1947) was a Polish Home Army officer during World War II. He fought in the battle of Kock in 1939 and the Warsaw Uprising in 1944, He was a Polish Navy officer from 1945 to 1947, who was executed after a show trial in 1947.

== Biography ==
Lieutenant Adam Dedio was born on 24 December 1918 in Zakopane in the newly reborn Poland. He joined the Navy Midshipmen School in 1937, evacuated with the School to Pińsk, fought with the Independent Operational Group "Polesie" against the Russian Red Army and then Nazi Germany Army, including the last battle of the 1939 Defensive War (battle of Kock), was wounded in the battle, and was promoted to Ensign in 1939. During the occupation of Poland he joined the Home Army, was arrested by the Gestapo (German: Geheime Staatspolizei, Secret State Police) was tortured for information without success; he was close to death when liberated. However, he recovered and was reunited with the Home Army.

After the war, Dedio enlisted in the new communist-controlled Navy and was the commanding officer of a submarine chaser (ORP Bystry) but was also a member of an anti-communist conspiracy. Arrested by the communist Military Information, he was heavily tortured and executed on 14 April 1947. His body was secretly buried in Gdańsk, but rediscovered and reburied in a state funeral ceremony in 2018. He is a patron of the 7th Pomeranian Territorial Defence Brigade in Gdańsk.

== Military promotions ==
Ensign (podporucznik)	1939
