= King Saud Air Base =

Military air base located in Hafr Al-Batin, Saudi Arabia

King Saud Air Base
- قاعدة الملك سعود الجوية
- Hafr Al-Batin, Eastern Province in Saudi Arabia
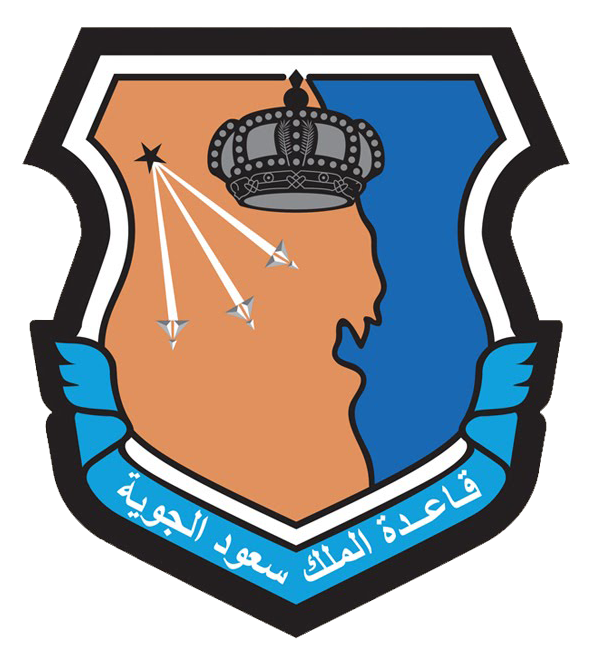
- Emblem of King Saud Air Base

Site information
- Type: Airbase
- Owner: Ministry of Defense
- Operator: Royal Saudi Air Force
- Controlled by: RSAF 4 Wing

Location
- Shown within Saudi Arabia
- Coordinates: 27°54′01″N 045°31′07″E

Site history
- In use: 1963 - present

Airfield information
- Identifiers: IATA: KMC, ICAO: OEKK
- Elevation: 412 metres (1,352 ft) AMSL
Runways
Direction	Length and surface
13L	4,000 metres (13,123 ft) Asphalt
31R	4,000 metres (13,123 ft) Asphalt
- Sources: Sky Vector

King Saud Air Base (Arabic: قاعدة الملك سعود الجوية) (IATA: KMC ICAO: OEKK) is a military air base located in Hafr Al-Batin, Saudi Arabia.

The air base is located approximately 60 km north of King Khalid Military City.

== Overview ==
- RSAF 4 Wing:
  - No. 7 Squadron RSAF with the Panavia Tornado IDS
  - No. 12 Squadron RSAF with the AB 212
  - No. 92 Squadron RSAF with the McDonnell Douglas F-15S Strike Eagle and the F-15SA

== See also ==
- List of airports in Saudi Arabia
