= 12th Territorial Defence Brigade =

- Polish: 12 Brygada Obrony Terytorialnej
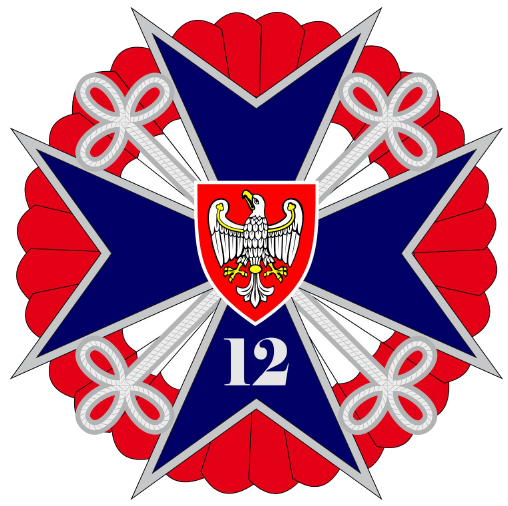
- Distinctive unit insignia
- Founded: January 2018
- Country: Poland
- Branch: Territorial Defence Force
- Type: Light infantry
- Garrison/HQ: Poznań
- Patron: gen. bryg. Stanisław Taczak

Commanders
- Current commander: Colonel Rafał Miernik

Insignia
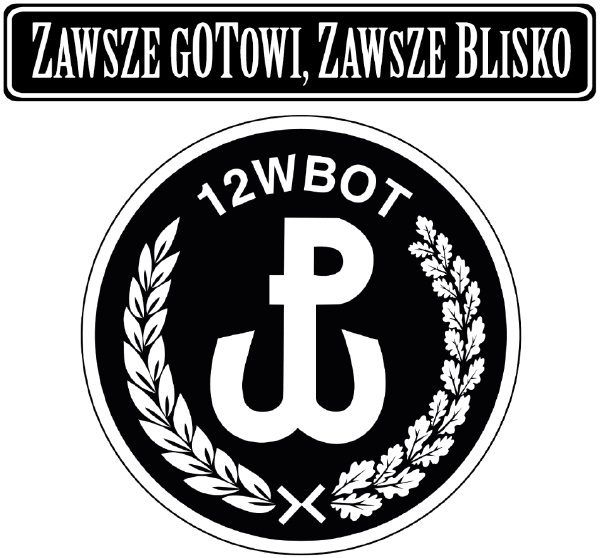
- Shoulder sleeve insignia (everyday uniform)

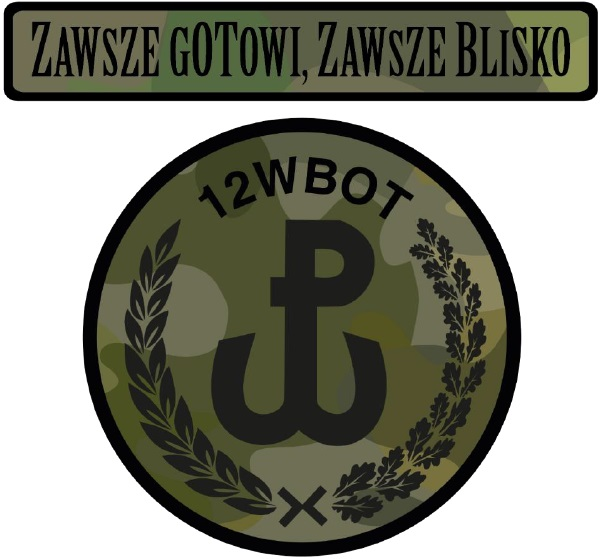
- Shoulder sleeve insignia (field uniform)

The 12th Territorial Defence Brigade is a military unit of the Territorial Defence Force of the Polish Armed Forces. The brigade is based in Poznań, Greater Poland Voivodeship.

== Organisation ==
- 12th Greater Poland Territorial Defence Brigade command — Poznań
  - 121st Light Infantry Battalion — Poznań (Ławica)
  - 122nd Light Infantry Battalion — Dolaszewo
  - 123rd Light Infantry Battalion — Turek, Poland
  - 124th Light Infantry Battalion — Śrem
  - 125th Light Infantry Battalion — Leszno

== Command ==
- Colonel Rafał Miernik
