= 138th Separate Tank Regiment =

5th Separate Tank Brigade (1962–1980) 138th Separate Tank Regiment (1980–1990)
- Active: 1962–1990
- Country: Soviet Union
- Branch: Soviet Army
- Type: Armor
- Part of: 2nd Guards Tank Army
- Garrison/HQ: Primerwalde

The 138th Separate Tank Regiment was a Cold War tank regiment of the Group of Soviet Forces in Germany's 2nd Guards Tank Army. Formed in 1962 as the 5th Separate Tank Brigade, it was initially tasked with defending the East German Baltic coast. It became the 138th Separate Tank Regiment in 1980. The regiment was disbanded in 1990.

== History ==
The brigade was activated in May 1962 in Schwerin, part of the 2nd Guards Tank Army. It moved to Primerwalde in 1964. The 24th Separate Tank Battalion and 22nd Separate Motor Rifle Battalion were based at Primerwalde. The 45th and 46th Separate Tank Battalions were at Wustrow. The 58th Separate Tank Battalion was at Garz. The tank battalions were equipped with T-54 tanks and the motor rifle battalion was equipped with BTR-152 armored personnel carriers. The brigade was tasked with the protection of the Baltic coastline. In 1974, the brigade had 130 T-54s.

In 1980 the brigade was renamed the 138th Separate Tank Regiment, with the task of parachuting and airlanding assaults on Denmark. The 24th, 45th and 58th Separate Tank Battalions were transferred to Mongolia and became part of the 12th, 41st and 91st Motor Rifle Divisions. The 46th Separate Tank Battalion and 22nd Separate Motor Rifle Battalion were disbanded. The regiment was also reequipped with T-55 and T-62 tanks, as well as BTR-60 armored personnel carriers. It was disbanded in April 1990.
