= Twelfth Amendment =

Twelfth Amendment may refer to:

- Twelfth Amendment to the United States Constitution
- Twelfth Amendment of the Constitution of India, incorporated Goa, Daman and Diu into India
- Twelfth Amendment of the Constitution of South Africa
- Twelfth Amendment of the Constitution Bill 1992, Republic of Ireland
