= 12th Tennessee Cavalry Regiment =

- Active: August 24, 1863 - October 7, 1865
- Country: United States
- Allegiance: Union
- Branch: Cavalry
- Engagements: Franklin-Nashville Campaign; Battle of Franklin; Battle of Nashville

The 12th Tennessee Cavalry Regiment was a cavalry regiment that served in the Union Army during the American Civil War.

== Service ==
The 12th Tennessee Cavalry was organized at Nashville, Tennessee and mustered in for a three-year enlistment on August 24, 1863, under the command of Colonel George Spalding. As late as February 22, 1864, only six companies had completed organization.

The regiment was attached to District of Nashville, Department of the Cumberland, to January 1864. Defenses of Nashville & Northwestern Railroad to April 1864. 2nd Brigade, 4th Division, Cavalry Corps, Department of the Cumberland, to October 1864. 2nd Brigade, 4th Division, Cavalry Corps, Military Division Mississippi, to December 1864. 2nd Brigade, 5th Division, Cavalry Corps, Military Division Mississippi, to February 1865. 1st Brigade, 5th Division, Cavalry Corps, Military Division Mississippi, to May 1865. Department of the Missouri to October 1865.

The 12th Tennessee Cavalry mustered out of service at Fort Leavenworth, Kansas, on October 7, 1865.

== Detailed service ==
Scout to Florence, Alabama, July 20–25, 1863 (detachment). Duty at Nashville and on Nashville & Northwestern Railroad at Pulaski, Tennessee, until November 1864. Duck River April 22, 1864. Scout in Hickman and Maury Counties May 2–12. Lincoln County June 14. Scout from Pulaski to Florence, Alabama, July 20–25 (detachment). Triune August 3–4. Florence August 10. Operations against Forrest in northern Alabama and middle Tennessee September 16-October 10. Richland Creek, near Pulaski, September 26. Pulaski September 26–27. Nashville Campaign November–December. On line of Shoal Creek November 5–20. Campbellsville and Lynnville November 24. In front of Columbia November 24–27. Franklin November 30. Battle of Nashville December 15–16. Pursuit of Hood to the Tennessee River December 17–28. West Harpeth River December 17. Spring Hill December 18. Rutherford Creek December 19. Curtis Creek December 19. Lawrenceburg December 22. Lynnville and Richland Creek December 24. King's Gap, near Pulaski, December 25. At Gravelly Springs, Alabama, until February 1865. At Eastport, Mississippi, until May. Moved to St. Louis, Missouri, May 15–17, thence to Rolla, Missouri, June 20–26, and to Fort Riley, Kansas, June 29-July 8.

== Commanders ==
- Colonel George Spalding - mustered as lieutenant colonel and promoted when the regiment's twelfth company was organized in August 1864

== Casualties ==
The regiment lost a total of 226 men during service; 5 officers and 28 enlisted men killed or mortally wounded, 2 officers and 191 enlisted men died of disease or accident.

== See also ==
- List of Tennessee Civil War units
- Tennessee in the Civil War
