= No. 12 Squadron RSAF =

- Active: 1970s-present
- Country: Saudi Arabia
- Branch: Royal Saudi Air Force
- Type: Squadron
- Part of: RSAF 15 Wing
- Base: King Saud Air Base, Hafar al-Batin
- Aircraft: Agusta AB 412EP

No. 12 Squadron RSAF is a squadron of the Royal Saudi Air Force that operates the Agusta AB 412EP at King Saud Air Base, Hafar al-Batin, Eastern Province in Saudi Arabia within RSAF 15 Wing.

It used to fly the Agusta AB-205 in the transport and liaison role at King Fahad Air Base, Taif.
