= 12th Public Security Division =

147th Division (1948–52) 12th Public Security Division (1952–55)
- Active: 1948.11 - 1955.9
- Country: People's Republic of China
- Branch: People's Liberation Army
- Type: Division
- Role: Infantry
- Part of: 49th Corps
- Engagements: Chinese Civil War

The 147th Division(Chinese: 第147师) was a military formation of the People's Liberation Army of the People's Republic of China.

The division was designated in November 1948 according to the Regulation of the Redesignations of All Organizations and Units of the Army, issued by Central Military Commission on November 1, 1948. from 36th Division, 12th Column of People's Liberation Army of Northeastern China. Its history could be traced to 5th Independent Division of Northeastern Democratic Coalition formed in July 1947.

The division was a part of 49th Corps. Under the flag of 147th division it took part in several major battles during the Chinese Civil War, including the siege of Changchun, Liaoshen campaign, Pingjin campaign and Guangxi campaign.

The division was then composed of 439th, 440th and 441st Regiments.

In April 1952, the division was reorganized as 12th Public Security Division(Chinese: 公安第12师). The division was then composed of 34th, 35th, 36th and 37th Public Security Regiments, stationing in Guangxi as a garrison unit.

In September 1955 the division was disbanded. Headquarters, 12th Public Security Division was converted to Headquarters, 1st Air Defense Corps, and all its 4 regiments were attached to Guangxi Military District's control.
