= 12th Reconnaissance Squadron (disambiguation) =

The 12th Reconnaissance Squadron is an active United States Air Force unit, originally constituted as the '12th Aero Squadron' in June 1917. It has held this designation since November 1991.

12th Reconnaissance Squadron may also refer to:

- 702nd Tactical Air Support Squadron, designated the '12th Reconnaissance Squadron (Heavy)' From January 1941 to April 1942
- 12th Tactical Reconnaissance Squadron (ROCAF), a Republic of China Air Force (Taiwan) squadron since 1932

== See also ==
- 12th Tactical Reconnaissance Squadron
