= 12 Squadron =

12 Squadron, No. 12 Squadron or 12th Squadron may refer to:

- No. 12 Squadron IAF, a unit of the Indian Air Force
- No. 12 Squadron (Finland), a unit of the Finnish Air Force
- No. 12 Squadron PAF, a unit of the Pakistan Air Force
- No. 12 Squadron RAAF, a unit of the Royal Australian Air Force
- No. 12 Squadron RAF, a unit of the United Kingdom Royal Air Force
- No. 12 Squadron RJAF, a unit of the Royal Jordanian Air Force
- No. 12 Squadron RSAF, a unit of the Royal Saudi Air Force
- No. 12 Squadron SLAF, a unit of the Sri Lankan Air Force
- 12 Squadron SAAF, a unit of the South African Air Force
- 12th Aero Squadron, a unit of the United States Army Air Service
- 12th Air Squadron, a unit of the Indonesian Air Force
- 12th Airborne Command and Control Squadron, a unit of the United States Air Force
- 12th Delta Operations Squadron, a unit of the United States Space Force
- 12th Fighter Squadron, a unit of the United States Air Force
- 12th Missile Squadron, a unit of the United States Air Force
- 12th Reconnaissance Squadron (disambiguation), several units
- 12th Space Warning Squadron, a unit of the United States Space Force
- Marine Aviation Logistics Squadron 12, a unit of the United States Marine Corps
- HS-12 (Helicopter Anti-Submarine Warfare Squadron 12), a unit of the United States Navy
- HSC-12 (Helicopter Sea Combat Squadron 12), a unit of the United States Navy
- RVAH-12 (Reconnaissance Attack (Heavy) Squadron 12), a unit of the United States Navy
- VA-12 (Attack Squadron 12), a unit of the United States Navy
- VAW-12 (Carrier Airborne Early Warning Squadron 12), a unit of the United States Navy
- VF-12 (Fighter Squadron 12), a unit of the United States Navy
- VFC-12 (Fighter Squadron Composite 12), a unit of the United States Navy

== See also ==
- XII Corps (disambiguation)
- 12th Division (disambiguation)
- 12th Brigade (disambiguation)
- 12th Battalion (disambiguation)
