= Władysław Liniarski =

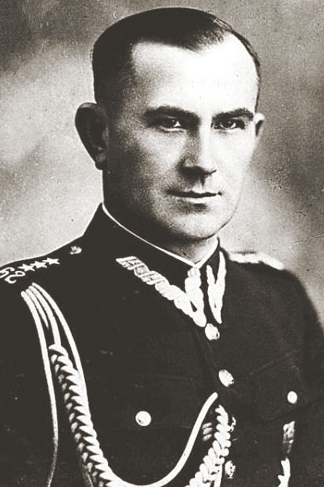
- Władysław Liniarski in 1939
- Born: 23 November 1897; Małachowice-Gustawów, Kingdom of Poland
- Died: 12 April 1984 (aged 86); Warsaw, Polish People's Republic
- Burial place: Powązki Cemetery,
- Military career
- Allegiance: Kingdom of Poland (1885–1918); Second Polish Republic (1918–1925)
- Branch: Polish Military Organisation; Polish Army
- Service years: 1917–1945
- Rank: Pułkownik (Colonel)
- Units: 62nd Infantry Regiment; Home Army; Citizens' Home Army
- Conflicts: World War I Polish–Soviet War; World War II; Anti-communist resistance in Poland
- Awards: Virtuti Militari; Order of Polonia Restituta; Cross of Valour; Cross of Merit with Swords; Cross of Merit; Medal for Long Service; Partisan Cross

Władysław Liniarski, alias Mścisław, Wuj, Jan (born November 23, 1897 in Małachowice-Gustawów – April 12, 1984 in Warsaw) was a colonel of the Polish Armed Forces, commander of the Białystok District of the Union of Armed Struggle from February to September 1941, commander of the Białystok District of the Union of Armed Struggle-Home Army (continuously for 5 years), from January 1945 commander of the Białystok District of the Citizens' Home Army. Activist of the post-war anti-communist underground, victim of communist repressions. In 1979 he became a member of the Committee for the Agreement for the Self-Determination of the Nation. In 2017 posthumously promoted to the rank of brigadier general

== Biography ==
Son of Jan and Józefa née Bielanowicz, owners of a two-morgen farm he was born in Małachowice-Gustawów in the Włoszczowa County of the Kielce Governorate. After graduating from primary school in 1913, he began studying at a teachers' seminary in Jędrzejów. He interrupted his studies at the outbreak of World War I. From 1917, he was active in the Polish Military Organization. During the Polish–Soviet War, he fought as a corporal in the 24th Infantry Regiment, then promoted to officer, and served for many years in chancelleries and commissariats.

In 1932, he served in the Command of the District Corps No. IX in Brest, in the rank of lieutenant with seniority from 1 July 1925 and 1st place in the corps of administrative officers, group of chancellery officers. In March 1934, he was transferred to the corps of infantry officers, leaving his position at the Infantry Cadet School. On September 15 of that year, he was transferred to the 62nd Infantry Regiment in Bydgoszcz. In March 1939, he commanded the 6th company in that regiment.

=== World War II ===
In the German Invasion and the Soviet Invasion of Poland, as commander of the 1st Battalion of the 62nd Infantry Regiment, he defended Pomerania and fought in the Battle of the Bzura. Wounded on September 20 in the Kampinos Forest, he was taken prisoner, from which he escaped. From 1940, he was the commander of the Białystok District of the Union of Armed Struggle and then Home Army in the Soviet occupation area.

In 1943, he issued an order to liquidate "communist-Jewish gangs", which later became the cause of accusations of anti-Semitism. By Order No. 256 of April 20, 1944, Lieutenant Colonel "Mścisław", commander of the "Sarna" District (Białystok AK District), gave the partisan units and units of the Kedyw of the Białystok AK District the names of regiments of the Polish Army. For example, the Augustów District No. 7 "Olcha" of the Suwałki Inspectorate was to recreate the 1st Krechowiecki Uhlan Regiment. Its temporary name for the time of formation was "Partisan Unit of the 1st Uhlan Regiment".

Liniarski, who was against the planned operation Burza, in orders addressed to the commanders of inspectorates and districts, emphasized the will to beat the Germans, prepare for self-defense, and in the event of communists taking over the area and hostility towards the Polish population - moving on to further underground activity.

Around July 10, 1944, "Mścisław" issued an order to begin the "Burza" operation in the area of the Łomża inspectorate.

On September 20, 1944, Capt. Zygmunt Szendzielarz and the remnants of the 5th Wilno Brigade of the Home Army subordinated to Liniarski. The latter ordered Szendzielarz to remain in the Białowieża Forest and organize a cadre unit from survivors of the Wilno and Nowogródek Home Army units. At the beginning of November 1944, the unit was joined by, among others, the officer of the Vilnius District of the Home Army, 2nd Lt. Lech Beynar also known Paweł Jasienica, pseudonym Nowina, later a well-known historian and publicist, writing under the pen name "Paweł Jasienica". On November 10, Zygmunt Szendzielarz was promoted by Liniarski to the rank of major. At the turn of January and February 1945, Lieutenant Colonel Liniarski appointed Zygmunt Szendzielarz as commander of the partisan forces of the Białystok District of the Home Army, and the 5th Vilnius Brigade became a disposable unit of the AKO Headquarters.

=== Post-war ===
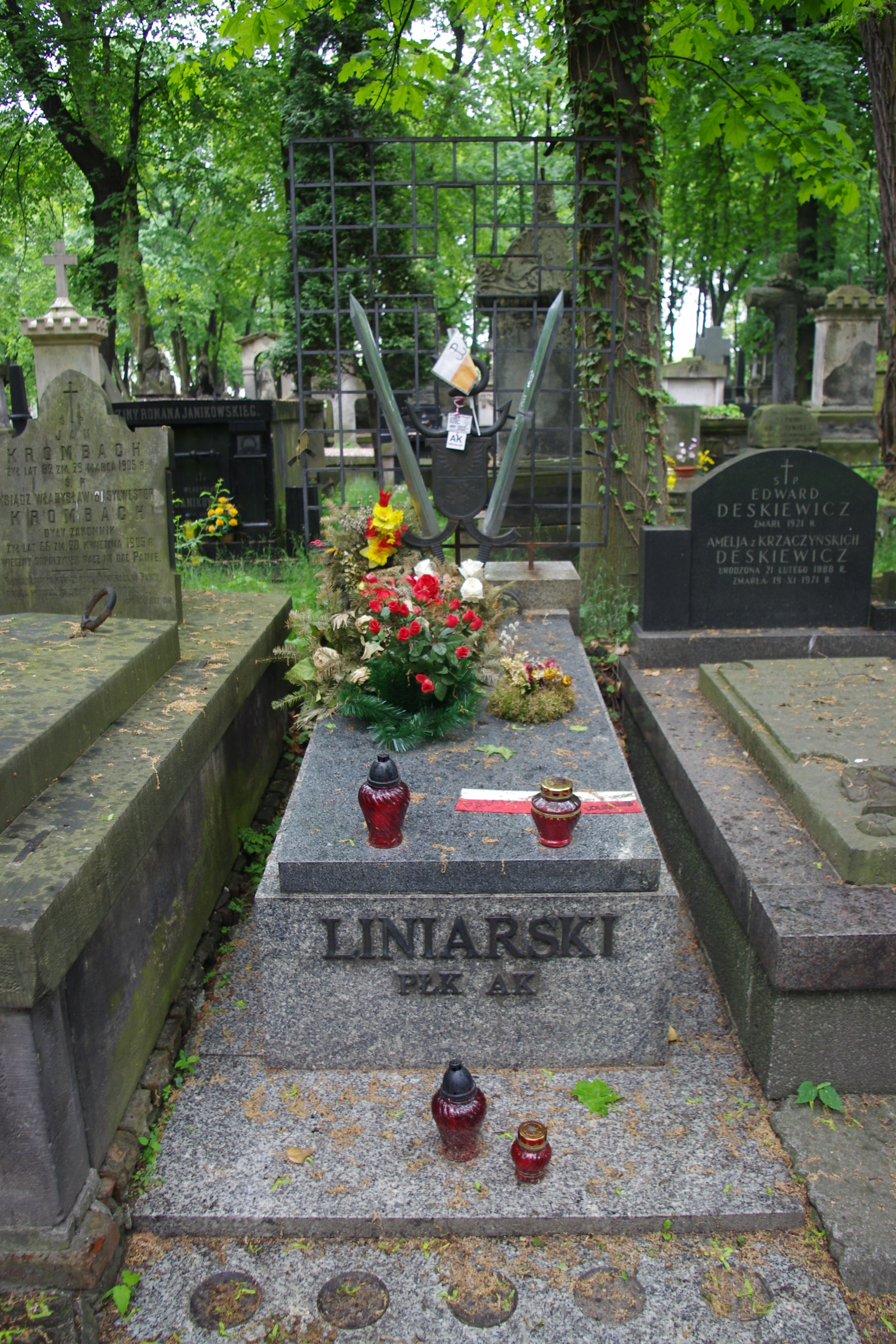
Liniarski's grave at the Powązki Cemetery

In May 1945, Liniarski subordinated himself to the Armed Forces Delegation for Poland, which forced him to limit his organizational work and military actions. Through the voivode of Białystok Voivodeship Stefan Dybowski, he attempted to reveal the District's structures. He was arrested on July 31, 1945 in Brwinów near Warsaw. On May 20, 1946, he was sentenced by the District Military Court in Warsaw to death, which was later commuted to 10 years in prison.

The structures of the Białystok District of the AKO became part of the Freedom and Independence Association. Many of its soldiers continued their activities, taking part in propaganda campaigns and distributing leaflets.

In March 1951, during the trial against General August Emil Fieldorf, exhausted by illness and interrogations, he was carried into the courtroom on a stretcher and gave testimony incriminating his former superior from Kedyw.

In 1953, he was released from prison in a serious health condition. On August 16 and August 20, 1957, Władysław Liniarski withdrew his statements forced on him during the investigation against General August Emil Fieldorf before Stanisław Krygiel, deputy prosecutor of the General Prosecutor's Office of the Polish People's Republic. In 1957, he received an allowance and assistance with medical care.

In March 1965, he was accepted into the Society of Fighters for Freedom and Democracy. Shortly afterwards, he sat on the Main Verification Commission of the Union of Fighters for Freedom and Democracy. In February 1979, he became a member of the Committee for the Agreement on the Self-Determination of the Nation. He was a member of the editorial board of the "Rzeczpospolita" magazine published by this organization. He was also active in the Movement for Defence of Human and Civic Rights.

He died on April 12, 1984 in Warsaw. He was buried at the Powązki Cemetery in Warsaw. The 1st Podlaska Territorial Defence Brigade is named in his honor.
