= 12th Indian Cavalry Brigade =

- Active: June 1918 –
- Country: British India
- Allegiance: British Crown
- Branch: British Indian Army
- Type: Cavalry
- Size: Brigade
- Part of: 4th (Quetta) Division
- Service: First World War

The 12th Indian Cavalry Brigade was a cavalry brigade of the British Indian Army that formed part of the Indian Army during the First World War. It remained in India throughout the war.

== History ==
The 12th Indian Cavalry Brigade (Note: Perry also names the brigade as 12th Mounted Brigade.) was formed under 4th (Quetta) Division in June 1918. It took command of three newly formed cavalry regiments:

- 40th Cavalry formed in April 1918 from
  - a squadron of 1st Duke of York's Own Lancers (Skinner's Horse)
  - "A" Squadron and two half squadrons of 3rd Skinner's Horse
  - another squadron
- 41st Cavalry formed in April 1918 from
  - "F" Squadron, 26th King George's Own Light Cavalry
  - "F" Squadron, 39th King George's Own Central India Horse
  - a squadron of 15th Lancers (Cureton's Multanis)
  - a squadron of 37th Lancers (Baluch Horse)
- 42nd Cavalry formed in April 1918 from
  - "F" Squadron, 35th Scinde Horse
  - a squadron from the depot of the 10th Duke of Cambridge's Own Lancers (Hodson's Horse)
  - two other squadrons

The brigade remained with the division throughout the First World War. It was commanded from 27 June 1918 by Brigadier-General H.B. Birdwood. All three constituent regiments were disbanded in 1921.

== See also ==
- 12th Cavalry Brigade (British Indian Army) existed at the same time but was unrelated other than having the same number

== Bibliography ==
- Gaylor, John (1996). Sons of John Company: The Indian and Pakistan Armies 1903–1991 (2nd ed.). Tunbridge Wells: Parapress. ISBN 1-898594-41-4.
- Perry, F.W. (1993). Order of Battle of Divisions Part 5B. Indian Army Divisions. Newport: Ray Westlake Military Books. ISBN 1-871167-23-X.
