= Dolaszewo =

- Village
- Location within Poland
- Coordinates: 53°10′N 16°39′E
- Country: Poland
- Voivodeship: Greater Poland
- County: Piła
- Gmina: Szydłowo
- Population: 620

Dolaszewo [dɔlaˈʂɛvɔ] (German: Hasenberg) is a village in the administrative district of Gmina Szydłowo, within Piła County, Greater Poland Voivodeship, in west-central Poland.
