= 12th Siberian Rifle Division =

12th Siberian Division
- 12-я Сибирская стрелковая дивизия
- Active: 1914–1918
- Country: Russian Empire
- Branch: Russian Imperial Army
- Role: Infantry
- Engagements: World War I

The 12th Siberian Rifle Division was an infantry formation of the Russian Imperial Army.

== History ==
The division was formed between 18 July and 31 August 1914 in Irkutsk from a mobilization division, the 7th Siberian Rifle Division. The division included the 45th and 46th Siberian Rifle Regiments in its 1st Brigade, and the 47th and 48th Siberian Rifle Regiments in its 2nd Brigade. Artillery support was provided by the 12th Siberian Artillery Brigade, and the division was commanded by Lieutenant General Nikolai Sulimov. The division was part of the 7th Siberian Army Corps for the duration of the war.

It was disbanded in March 1918 in the Central Black Earth Region, along with the rest of the corps.
