= 12th Motor Rifle Division =

Motor rifle division of the Soviet military

- Active: 1957–1958; 1960–1992
- Country: Soviet Union
- Branch: Soviet Army
- Type: Motorized Infantry
- Garrison/HQ: Divizionnaya (1960–1979; 1992–1993)
- Battle honours: Amur (1st formation)

The 12th Motor Rifle Division was a motorized infantry division of the Soviet Army, formed twice. It was formed in 1957 from the 12th Rifle Division and disbanded in 1958. The division was reformed in 1960 and moved to Baganuur in Mongolia in 1979. It pulled out of Mongolia in 1990 and became a storage base in 1992. The storage base was disbanded in 1993.

== History ==
=== First formation ===
The 12th Motor Rifle Division was first formed on 17 May 1957 in Belogorsk, Amur Oblast from the 12th Amur Rifle Division. The division included the 192nd, 214th and 394th Motor Rifle Regiments and the 138th Guards Tank Regiment. Part of the Far Eastern Military District, it was disbanded on 15 October 1958.

=== Second formation ===
In June 1960, the division was reformed in Divizionnaya (in Ulan-Ude), Buryat Autonomous Soviet Socialist Republic. It was part of the Transbaikal Military District and did not inherit the honorifics of the previous division. On 19 February 1962, the 964th Separate Missile Battalion was formed. In June 1967, the army became part of the 44th Army Corps. In 1968, the 1156th Separate Sapper Battalion became a sapper-engineer unit. In May 1970, the division was subordinated to the 29th Army.

On 15 March 1979, the division moved to Baganuur, Mongolia, and became part of the 39th Army due to increased tensions caused by the Sino-Vietnamese War. It was upgraded to 65% strength from its previous 15% manning. In 1980, the motor transport battalion became the 1161st Separate Material Supply Battalion. In April of that year, the 34th Separate Tank Battalion was attached to the division. It was previously part of the 138th Separate Tank Regiment in East Germany. The 523rd Motor Rifle Regiment transferred to the 51st Tank Division in the same year and was replaced by that division's 189th Motor Rifle Regiment. In 1985, the 189th moved back to the 51st and the 523rd became part of the 12th Motor Rifle Division again. The 34th Separate Tank Battalion was disbanded around this time. In 1989, the 189th once again returned to the division and the 523rd transferred back to the 51st Tank Division. In May 1990, after the Mongolian Revolution of 1990, the 598th Motor Rifle Regiment returned to Divizionnaya. The rest of the division soon followed and its headquarters moved to Divizionnaya in June 1992, becoming part of the 57th Army Corps. There, the division became the 5517th Weapons and Equipment Storage Base. The storage base was disbanded in 1993.

== Composition ==
In 1988, the division included the following units.

- 523rd Motor Rifle Regiment (Boganur, Mongolia) - equipped with BTR
- 592nd Motor Rifle Regiment (Ulan-Bator, Mongolia) - equipped with BTR
- 598th Motor Rifle Regiment (Boganur, Mongolia) - equipped with BMP
- 365th Tank Regiment (Boganur, Mongolia)
- 1282nd Artillery Regiment (Boganur, Mongolia)
- 1178th Anti-Aircraft Missile Regiment (Boganur, Mongolia)
- 964th Separate Missile Battalion (Boganur, Mongolia)
- Separate Anti-Tank Artillery Battalion (Boganur, Mongolia)
- 132nd Separate Reconnaissance Battalion (Boganur, Mongolia)
- 1156th Separate Engineer-Sapper Battalion (Boganur, Mongolia)
- 1041st Separate Communications Battalion (Boganur, Mongolia)
- Separate Chemical Defence Company (Boganur, Mongolia)
- Separate Equipment Maintenance and Recovery Battalion (Boganur, Mongolia)
- 636th Separate Medical Battalion (Boganur, Mongolia)
- 1161st Separate Material Supply Battalion (Boganur, Mongolia)
