= Twelfth Avenue (disambiguation) =

Twelfth Avenue is a short portion of the West Side Highway in Manhattan.

Twelfth Avenue or 12 Av could also refer to:

- 13th Avenue (Borough Park), the commercial center of Borough Park, Brooklyn
- 12th Avenue South Bridge, a permanent steel bridges in Seattle.
- Clinton Street/Southeast 12th Avenue station, a train station in Portland, Oregon.
- Washington/Southeast 12th Avenue station, a train station in Hillsboro, Oregon.
- Judah and 12th Avenue station, a train station in San Francisco, California.
- 12 Av, the twelfth day of Av, the fifth month of the Hebrew calendar
