= 12th Rifle Division (Soviet Union) =

Soviet Army formation

- Active: I Formation: 1918–1921; II Formation: 5 October 1923 – 1957
- Country: Soviet Union
- Branch: Red Army
- Type: Infantry
- Size: Division
- Part of: 2nd Red Banner Army
- Engagements: Russian Civil War Polish-Soviet War: Battle of Warsaw (1920); Soviet–Japanese War: Soviet invasion of Manchuria
- Battle honours: On behalf of the Petrograd Soviet (1st formation); Amur (2nd formation); On behalf of the Siberian Revolutionary Committee (2nd formation)

The 12th Rifle Division was an infantry division of the Red Army, formed twice. The division's first formation fought in the Russian Civil War and Polish–Soviet War. It was disbanded in 1921. The division formed again in 1923 at Omsk and spent World War II in Siberia. It participated in the Soviet invasion of Manchuria and was converted into a motor rifle division in 1957.

== History ==
=== First formation ===
The division was formed on 22 October 1918 from the 1st Voronezh Infantry Division. It fought on the Southern Front of the Russian Civil War. In December 1919, it fought in the Donbass Operation as part of the 1st Cavalry Army. After fighting in the Kuban campaign in February and March 1920, the division was sent to the Western Front in April. Between May and August, it fought in the Polish–Soviet War, participating in the Battle of Warsaw. In November it transferred to Ukraine and fought against Symon Petliura's army. The division was given the honorific "on behalf of the Petrograd Soviet" on 13 December 1920. On 31 March 1921, it became the border troops division of the Cheka of Ukraine and Crimea.

=== Second formation ===
It was formed 5 October 1923 in Omsk (order the troops of the West Siberian MD No. 563). On 18 February 1924, it was given the name of the Siberian Revolutionary Committee. It was part of the Western Siberian Military District from its formation until 1924. From 1924 until 1934 it was part of the Siberian Military District. It then joined the 18th Rifle Corps of the Special Far Eastern Army, with which it served from 1934 to 1938. In 1938 it was reassigned to the 2nd Red Banner Army. It took part in active fighting from 9 August 1945 to 5 September 1945.

At the beginning of the German invasion of the Soviet Union, it was stationed in the Blagoveshchensk area, and did not participate in the fighting on the Eastern Front of World War II. On 9 August 1945 it participated in the Soviet invasion of Manchuria, crossing the River Amur and Ussuri, and capturing several cities in China, defeating the Kwantung Army. The division destroyed the large Maolantun center of resistance.

On 14 September 1945, it was given the honorific 'Amur,' and thus its full name became '12th Rifle Division behalf of Amur Siberian Revolutionary Committee.'

It became the 12th Motor Rifle Division on 17 May 1957 at Belogorsk, Amur Oblast with the Far Eastern Military District. It disbanded on 15 October 1958.

== Units – 1945 ==
- 57th Rifle Regiment
- 192nd Rifle Regiment
- 214th Amur Order of the Red Star Rifle Regiment
- 7th Khingan Artillery Regiment
- 238th Howitzer artillery Regiment
- 482nd Self-propelled Artillery Battalion
- 96th separate Anti-tank Battalion
- 29th Reconnaissance Battalion
- 34th separate Engineer Battalion
- 80th separate battalion
- 616th medico-sanitary battalion
- 3rd separate chemical protection company
- 8th repair and replacement company
- 301st Motor Transport Battalion
- 54th (424th) trucking company
- 57th (13th), field bread house
- 158th Divisional veterinarians' hospital
- 128th Field Postal Station
- 2nd (268th) Field ticket office of the State Bank

== Commanders ==
- Fyodor Kuzmich Kuzmin (1926–1930)
- Andrey K. Smirnov (1930–1936)
- Grigory Stelmakh (1936–1938)
- Colonel Alexander Maximov, c 7 October 1941 Major General – 26 March 1941 to 22 April 1942
- Major General Ivan Makarenko – c 22 April 1942 to 26 May 1942
- Major General Andrei Ilyich Kryuchkov – 26 May 1942 to 5 September 1945

== Sources ==
- Feskov, V.I.; Golikov, V.I.; Kalashnikov, K.A.; Slugin, S.A. (2013). Вооруженные силы СССР после Второй Мировой войны: от Красной Армии к Советской [The Armed Forces of the USSR after World War II: From the Red Army to the Soviet: Part 1 Land Forces] (in Russian). Tomsk: Scientific and Technical Literature Publishing. ISBN 9785895035306.
