= 12th Brigade =

12th Brigade or 12th Infantry Brigade may refer to:

== Argentina ==
- XII Bush Brigade (Argentina)

== Armenia ==
- 12th Peacekeeping Brigade (Armenia)

== Australia ==
- 12th Brigade (Australia)

== Brazil ==
- 12th Light Infantry Brigade (Airmobile)

== Canada ==
- 12th Infantry Brigade (Canada)

== China ==
- 12th Armored Brigade (People's Republic of China)

== Germany ==
- 12th Panzer Brigade (Bundeswehr)

== Hungary ==
- 12th Infantry Brigade (Hungary)

== India ==
- 12th Cavalry Brigade (British Indian Army) of the British Indian Army in the First World War, distinct from the one below
- 12th Indian Cavalry Brigade of the British Indian Army in the First World War, distinct from the one above
- 12th Indian Brigade of the British Indian Army in the First World War
- 12th Indian Infantry Brigade of the British Indian Army in the Second World War

== Israel ==
- Negev Brigade

== Japan ==
- 12th Brigade (Japan)

== Poland ==
- 12th Territorial Defence Brigade (Poland)

== South Africa ==
- 12th Motorised Brigade (South Africa)

== Spain ==
- XII International Brigade

== Ukraine ==
- 12th Army Aviation Brigade (Ukraine)
- 12th Heavy Mechanized Brigade
- 12th Operational Brigade (Ukraine)

== United Kingdom ==
- 12th Anti-Aircraft Brigade (United Kingdom)
- 12th Armoured Brigade (United Kingdom)
- 12th Mechanised Brigade (United Kingdom)
- 12th Mounted Brigade (United Kingdom)
- 12th Reserve Brigade
- 12th Signal Brigade (United Kingdom)

=== Artillery units ===
- 12th (Howitzer) Brigade, Royal Field Artillery
- 12th (Carnarvon and Denbigh) Medium Brigade, Royal Garrison Artillery
- XII Brigade, Royal Horse Artillery

== United States ==
- 12th Combat Aviation Brigade

== See also ==
- 12th Division (disambiguation)
- 12th Regiment (disambiguation)
