= 12th Regiment =

The 12th Regiment may refer to many military units.

- 12^{e} Régiment blindé du Canada
- 12th Infantry Regiment (South Korea)
- 12th Regiment Royal Artillery
- 12th Infantry Regiment (Philippine Commonwealth)
- 12th Infantry Regiment (USAFIP-NL)
- 12th Infantry Regiment (United States)
- 12th Cavalry Regiment (United States)
- 12th Regiment Massachusetts Volunteer Infantry (American Civil War)
- 12th Armoured Regiment (Australia)
- 12th Armoured Regiment (India)
- 12th MNLA Regiment (Malayan National Liberation Army)
