= Kurzebiela =

- Village
- Location within Poland
- Coordinates: 52°36′41″N 18°8′54″E
- Country: Poland
- Voivodeship: Kuyavian-Pomeranian
- County: Mogilno
- Gmina: Strzelno
- Time zone: UTC+1 (CET)
  - Summer (DST): UTC+2 (CEST)
- Vehicle registration: CMG

Kurzebiela [kuʐɛˈbjɛla] is a settlement, part of the village of Łąkie, in the administrative district of Gmina Strzelno, within Mogilno County, Kuyavian-Pomeranian Voivodeship, in north-central Poland.

During the German occupation of Poland (World War II), the Gestapo carried out massacres of around 200 Poles in the Kurzebiela forest in 1940. In 1944, the Germans burned the bodies of the victims in attempt to cover up the crime (see Nazi crimes against the Polish nation).
