= Słaboszewko =

- Village
- Location within Poland
- Coordinates: 52°46′52″N 17°55′26″E
- Country: Poland
- Voivodeship: Kuyavian-Pomeranian
- County: Mogilno
- Gmina: Dąbrowa
- Population: 270

Słaboszewko [swabɔˈʂɛfkɔ] is a village in the administrative district of Gmina Dąbrowa, within Mogilno County, Kuyavian-Pomeranian Voivodeship, in north-central Poland.
