= Mierucin =

Mierucin may refer to:

- Mierucin, Mogilno County, Poland
- Mierucin, Sępólno County, Poland
