= Padniewko =

- Village
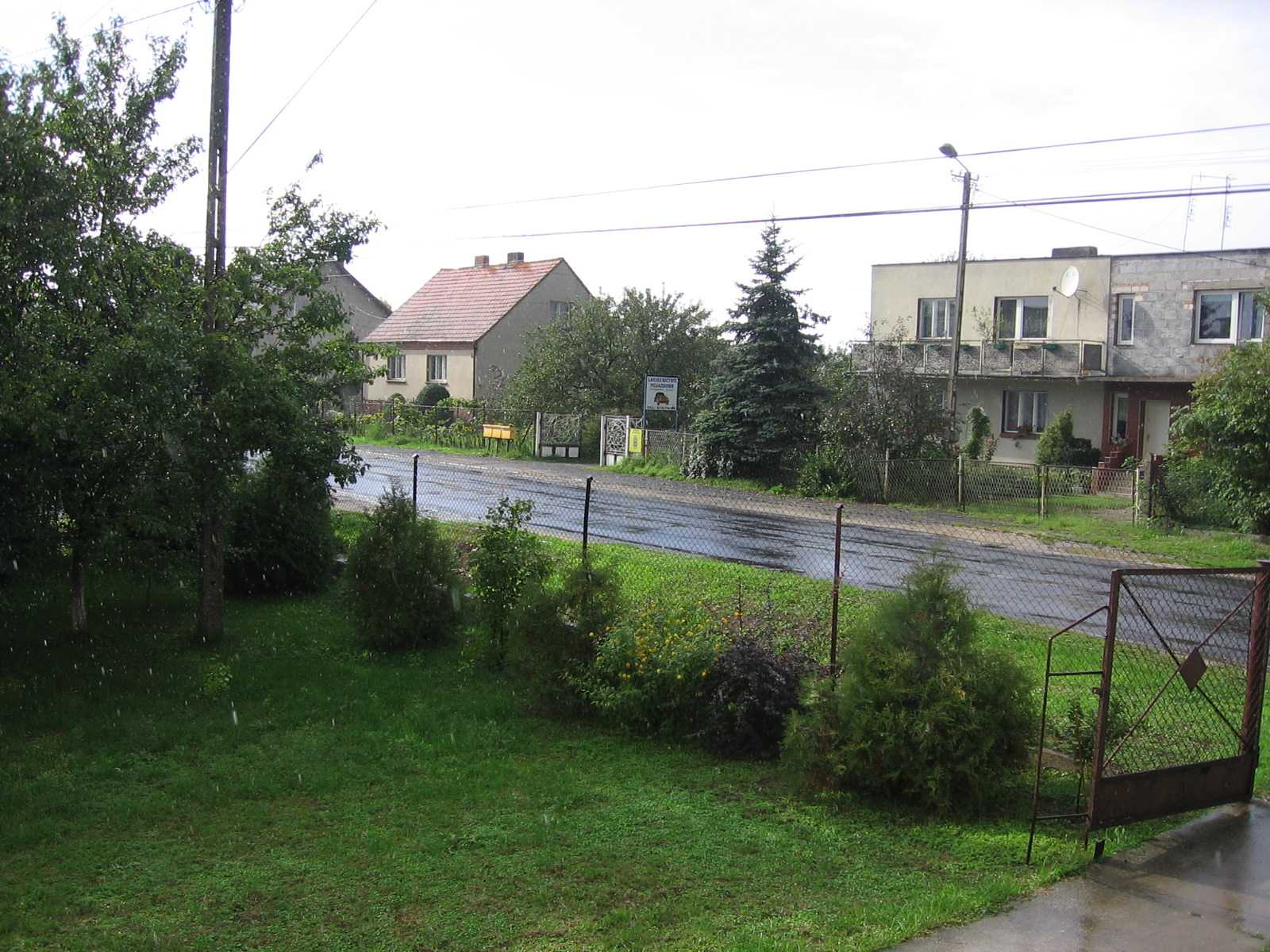
- View of the village

- Location within Poland
- Coordinates: 52°39′49″N 17°54′31″E
- Country: Poland
- Voivodeship: Kuyavian-Pomeranian
- County: Mogilno
- Gmina: Mogilno

Population
  - Total: 399
- Time zone: UTC+1 (CET)
  - Summer (DST): UTC+2 (CEST)
- Vehicle registration: CMG

Padniewko [padˈɲɛfkɔ] is a village in the administrative district of Gmina Mogilno, within Mogilno County, Kuyavian-Pomeranian Voivodeship, in central Poland.

The village was first mentioned in the 12th century. It is now becoming a suburb of Mogilno.

Eight Polish citizens were murdered by Nazi Germany in the village during World War II. There is a memorial at the site.
