= Przedbórz (disambiguation) =

Przedbórz may refer to the following places:

- Przedbórz, Kuyavian-Pomeranian Voivodeship (central Poland)
- Przedbórz in Łódź Voivodeship (central Poland)
- Przedbórz, Subcarpathian Voivodeship (south-east Poland)
- Przedbórz, Masovian Voivodeship (central Poland)
