= Gmina Dąbrowa =

Gmina Dąbrowa may refer to either of the following rural administrative districts in Poland:

- Gmina Dąbrowa, Kuyavian-Pomeranian Voivodeship
- Gmina Dąbrowa, Opole Voivodeship
