= Mirosławice, Kuyavian-Pomeranian Voivodeship =

Mirosławice
- Village
- Location within Poland
- Coordinates: 52°35′19″N 18°16′09″E
- Country: Poland
- Voivodeship: Kuyavian-Pomeranian
- County: Mogilno
- Gmina: Strzelno

Mirosławice [mirɔswaˈvit͡sɛ] is a village in the administrative district of Gmina Strzelno, within Mogilno County, Kuyavian-Pomeranian Voivodeship, in north-central Poland.
