= Strzelce, Kuyavian-Pomeranian Voivodeship =

Strzelce
- Village
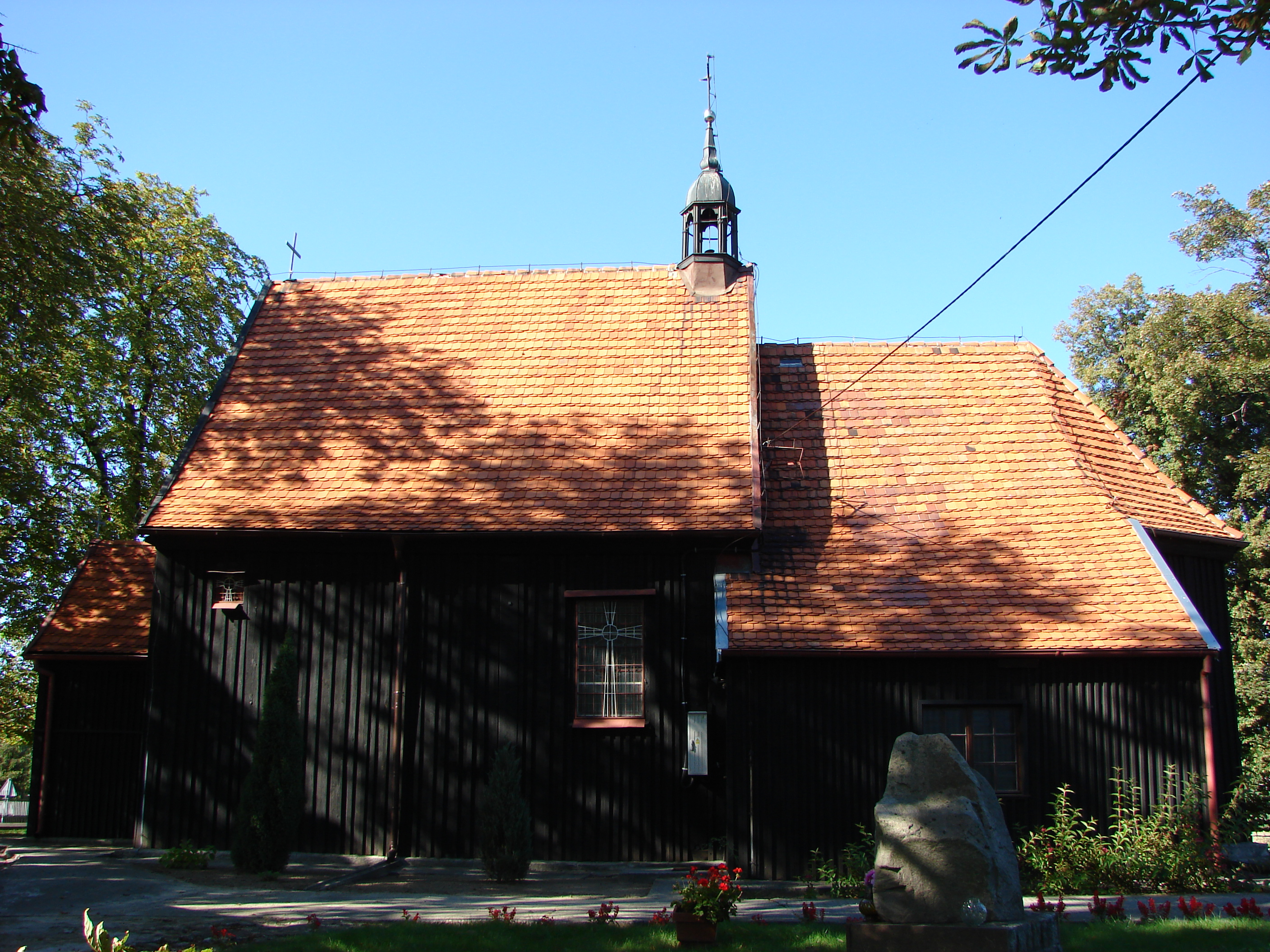
- St. Mary's wooden church from the first half of the 17th century.

- Location within Poland
- Coordinates: 52°41′N 18°6′E
- Country: Poland
- Voivodeship: Kuyavian-Pomeranian
- County: Mogilno
- Gmina: Mogilno

Strzelce [ˈstʂɛlt͡sɛ] is a village in the administrative district of Gmina Mogilno, within Mogilno County, Kuyavian-Pomeranian Voivodeship, in north-central Poland.
