= Wyrobki =

Wyrobki may refer to:

- Wyrobki, Mogilno County
- Wyrobki, Radziejów County
