= Krzyżanna =

- Village
- Location within Poland
- Coordinates: 52°39′18″N 18°6′20″E
- Country: Poland
- Voivodeship: Kuyavian-Pomeranian
- County: Mogilno
- Gmina: Mogilno
- Population: 50

Krzyżanna [kʂɨˈʐanna] is a village in the administrative district of Gmina Mogilno, within Mogilno County, Kuyavian-Pomeranian Voivodeship, in north-central Poland.
