= Gozdawa =

Gozdawa may refer to the following places in Poland:

- Gozdawa, Lower Silesian Voivodeship (south-west Poland)
- Gozdawa, Kuyavian-Pomeranian Voivodeship (north-central Poland)
- Gozdawa, Masovian Voivodeship (east-central Poland)
- Gozdawa, Pomeranian Voivodeship (north Poland)

== See also ==
- Gozdawa Coat of Arms
