= Stodoły, Kuyavian-Pomeranian Voivodeship =

Stodoły
- Village
- Location within Poland
- Coordinates: 52°38′N 18°13′E
- Country: Poland
- Voivodeship: Kuyavian-Pomeranian
- County: Mogilno
- Gmina: Strzelno
- Population: 190

Stodoły [stɔˈdɔwɨ] is a village in the administrative district of Gmina Strzelno, within Mogilno County, Kuyavian-Pomeranian Voivodeship, in north-central Poland.
