= Kijewice =

Kijewice may refer to the following places:

- Kijewice, Kuyavian-Pomeranian Voivodeship (north-central Poland)
- Kijewice, Lubusz Voivodeship (west Poland)
- Kijewice, Masovian Voivodeship (east-central Poland)
