= Bielice, Kuyavian-Pomeranian Voivodeship =

Bielice
- Village
- Location within Poland
- Coordinates: 52°36′N 18°0′E
- Country: Poland
- Voivodeship: Kuyavian-Pomeranian
- County: Mogilno
- Gmina: Mogilno
- Population: 292
- Website: http://www.bielice.neostrada.pl

Bielice [bjɛˈlit͡sɛ] is a village in the administrative district of Gmina Mogilno, within Mogilno County, Kuyavian-Pomeranian Voivodeship, in north-central Poland.

In 2008 the village had a population of 292.
