= Dzierzazno =

Dzierzazno may refer to the following places in Poland:

- Dzierzążno, Kuyavian-Pomeranian Voivodeship
- Dzierżążno, Kartuzy County, Pomeranian Voivodeship
- Dzierżążno, Tczew County, Pomeranian Voivodeship
