= Bławatki =

- Village
- Location within Poland
- Coordinates: 52°38′51″N 18°8′41″E
- Country: Poland
- Voivodeship: Kuyavian-Pomeranian
- County: Mogilno
- Gmina: Strzelno

Bławatki [bwaˈvatki] is a village in the administrative district of Gmina Strzelno, within Mogilno County, Kuyavian-Pomeranian Voivodeship, in north-central Poland.
