= Skrzeszewo =

Skrzeszewo may refer to:

- Skrzeszewo, Kuyavian-Pomeranian Voivodeship, a village in north-central Poland
- Skrzeszewo, Pomeranian Voivodeship, a village in northern Poland
- Skrzeszewo, West Pomeranian Voivodeship, a village in north-western Poland
