= Marcinkowo, Mogilno County =

Marcinkowo
- Village
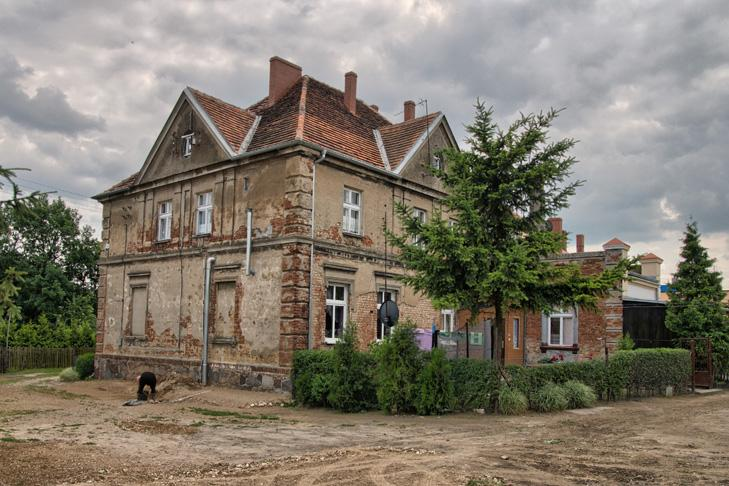
- Marcinkowo Manor House

- Location within Poland
- Coordinates: 52°36′06″N 17°59′10″E
- Country: Poland
- Voivodeship: Kuyavian-Pomeranian
- County: Mogilno
- Gmina: Mogilno

Marcinkowo [mart͡ɕiŋˈkɔvɔ] is a village in the administrative district of Gmina Mogilno, within Mogilno County, Kuyavian-Pomeranian Voivodeship, in north-central Poland.
