= Parlin, Mogilno County =

Parlin
- Village
- Location within Poland
- Coordinates: 52°44′N 17°54′E
- Country: Poland
- Voivodeship: Kuyavian-Pomeranian
- County: Mogilno
- Gmina: Dąbrowa

Parlin [ˈparlin] is a village in the administrative district of Gmina Dąbrowa, within Mogilno County, Kuyavian-Pomeranian Voivodeship, in north-central Poland.
