= Stodólno =

- Village
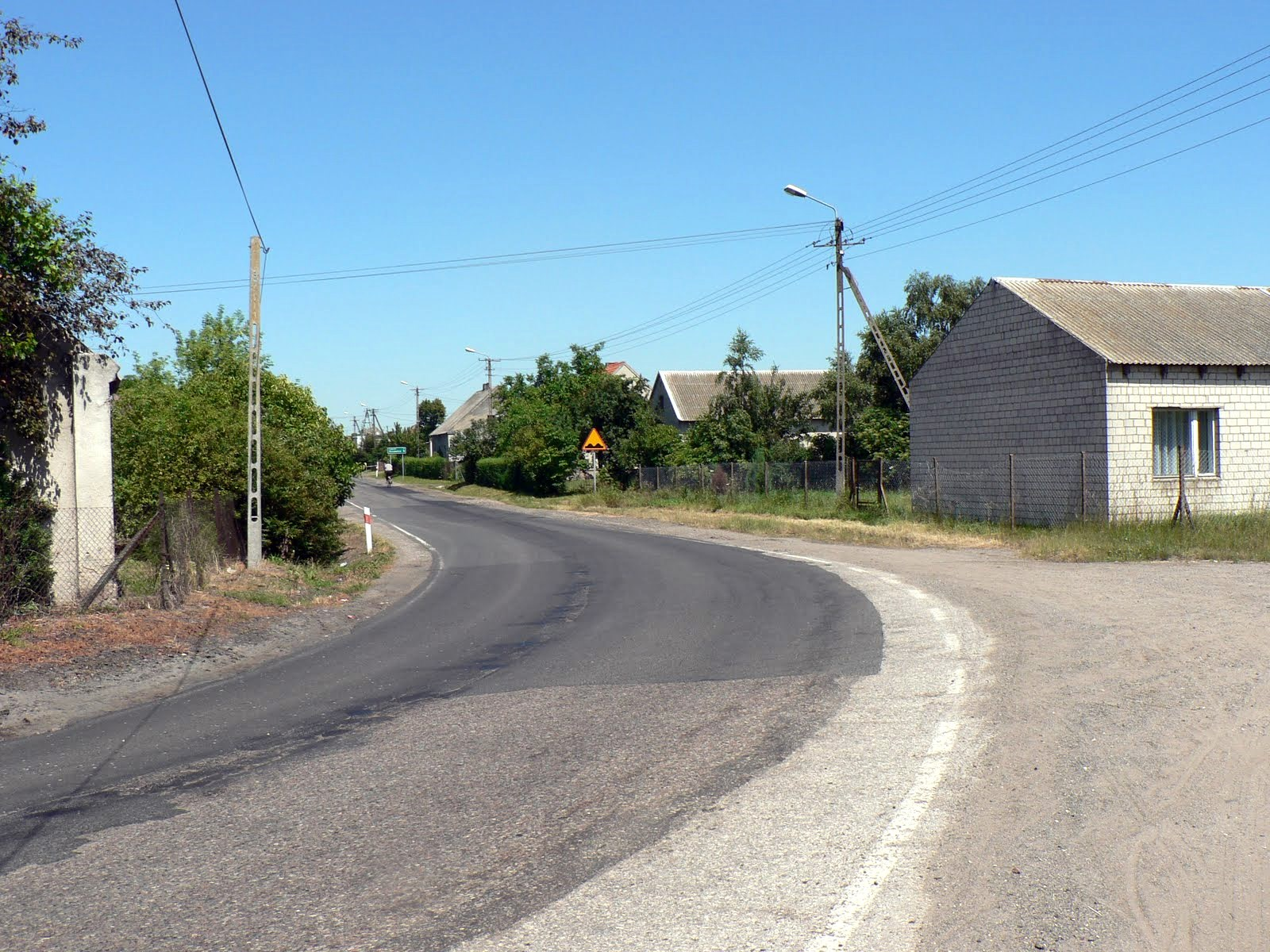

- Location within Poland
- Coordinates: 52°39′42.14″N 18°13′58.38″E
- Country: Poland
- Voivodeship: Kuyavian-Pomeranian
- County: Mogilno
- Gmina: Strzelno

Stodólno [stɔˈdulnɔ] is a village in the administrative district of Gmina Strzelno, within Mogilno County, Kuyavian-Pomeranian Voivodeship, in north-central Poland.
