= Zofijówka =

Zofijówka may refer to the following places:

- Zofijówka, Kuyavian-Pomeranian Voivodeship (north-central Poland)
- Zofijówka, Lublin Voivodeship (east Poland)
- Zofijówka, Opole Voivodeship (south-west Poland)
- Zofijówka, Warmian-Masurian Voivodeship (north Poland)
