= Bąbowo =

- Village
- Location within Poland
- Coordinates: 52°39′27″N 17°59′40″E
- Country: Poland
- Voivodeship: Kuyavian-Pomeranian
- County: Mogilno
- Gmina: Mogilno
- Population: 16

Bąbowo [bɔmˈbɔvɔ] is a village in the administrative district of Gmina Mogilno, within Mogilno County, Kuyavian-Pomeranian Voivodeship, in North-Central Poland.
