= Górki, Kuyavian-Pomeranian Voivodeship =

Górki
- Village
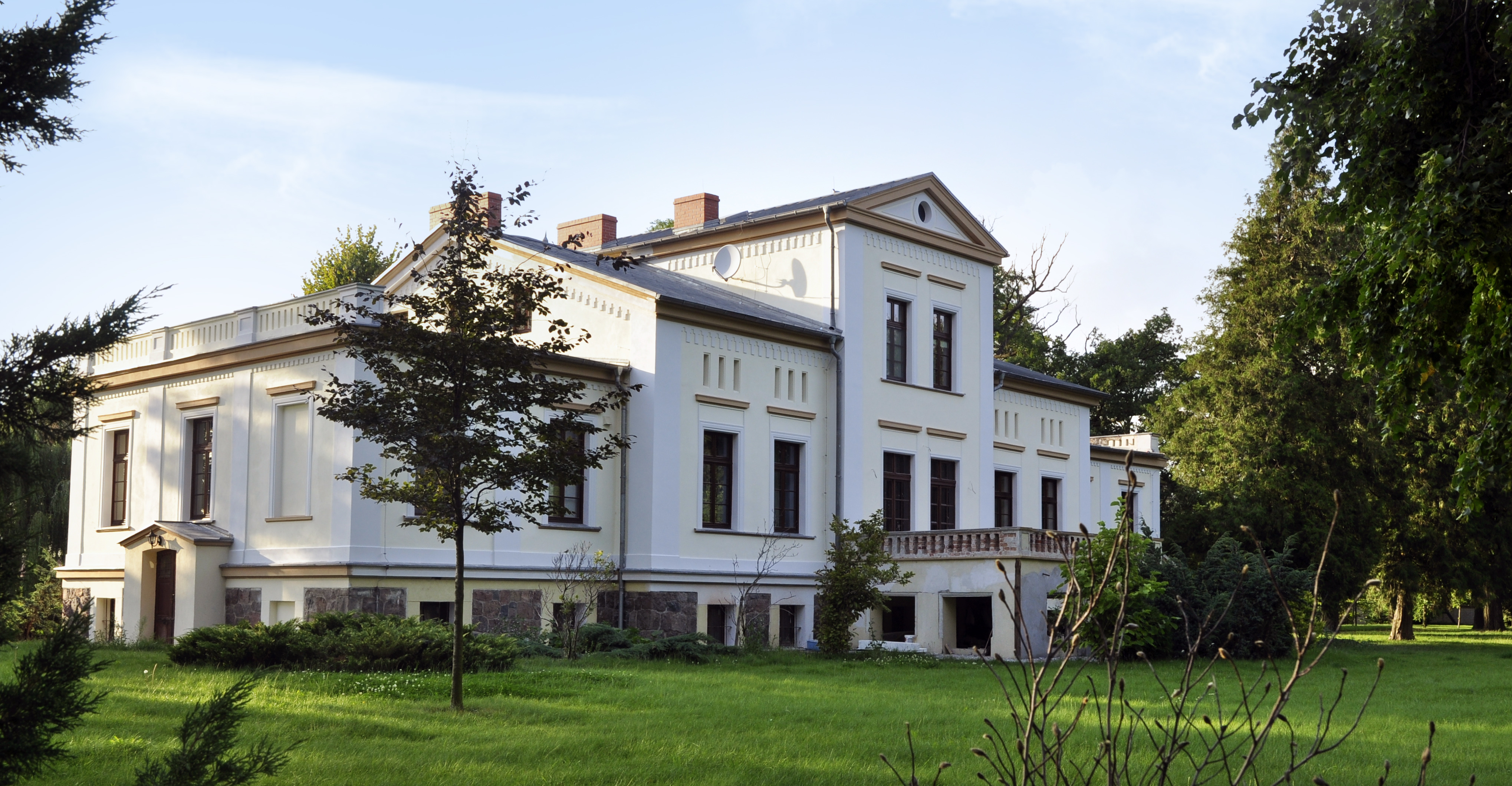

- Location within Poland
- Coordinates: 52°42′15″N 18°09′42″E
- Country: Poland
- Voivodeship: Kuyavian-Pomeranian
- County: Mogilno
- Gmina: Strzelno
- Time zone: UTC+1 (CET)
  - Summer (DST): UTC+2 (CEST)

Górki [ˈɡurki] is a village in the administrative district of Gmina Strzelno, within Mogilno County, Kuyavian-Pomeranian Voivodeship, in central Poland. According to 2021 census data, Górki had a population of 187. Its SIMC identifier is 0096454.
