= Szczeglin, Kuyavian-Pomeranian Voivodeship =

Szczeglin
- Village
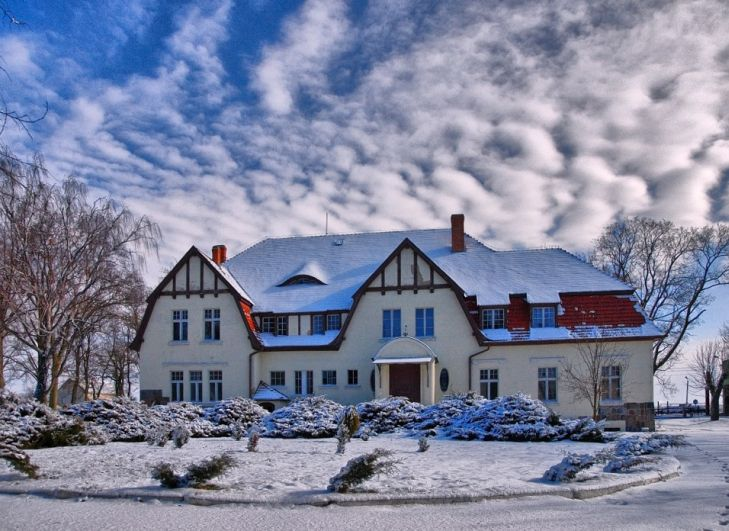
- Werner von Borck manor in the village

- Location within Poland
- Coordinates: 52°39′43.73″N 18°0′18.32″E
- Country: Poland
- Voivodeship: Kuyavian-Pomeranian
- County: Mogilno
- Gmina: Mogilno

Szczeglin [ˈʂt͡ʂɛɡlin] is a village in the administrative district of Gmina Mogilno, within Mogilno County, Kuyavian-Pomeranian Voivodeship, in north-central Poland.
