= Niemojewko =

- Village
- Location within Poland
- Coordinates: 52°43′27″N 18°13′00″E
- Country: Poland
- Voivodeship: Kuyavian-Pomeranian
- County: Mogilno
- Gmina: Strzelno

Niemojewko [ɲɛmɔˈjɛfkɔ] is a village in the administrative district of Gmina Strzelno, within Mogilno County, Kuyavian-Pomeranian Voivodeship, in north-central Poland.
