= Ciencisko =

- Village
- Location within Poland
- Coordinates: 52°35′32″N 18°07′44″E
- Country: Poland
- Voivodeship: Kuyavian-Pomeranian
- County: Mogilno
- Gmina: Strzelno
- Population: 250

Ciencisko [t͡ɕɛnˈt͡ɕiskɔ] is a village in the administrative district of Gmina Strzelno, within Mogilno County, Kuyavian-Pomeranian Voivodeship, in north-central Poland. In local baptism records from 1792, the place is written variously as Cientzisko, Cientcziszko and Cientiszko.
