= Wronowy =

- Village
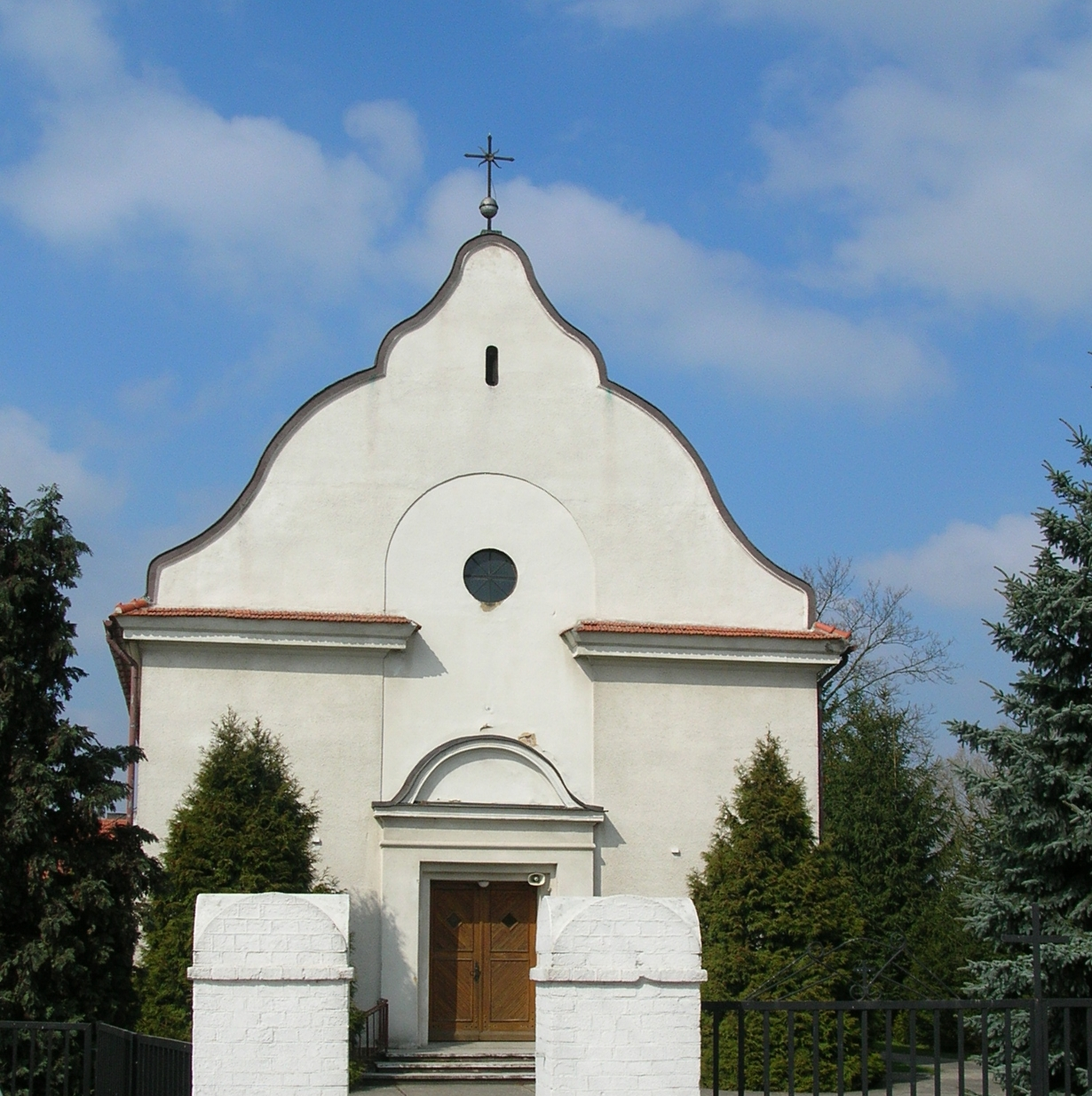
- The Church of St. Ignatius of Loyola in Wronowy

- Location within Poland
- Coordinates: 52°35′N 18°14′E
- Country: Poland
- Voivodeship: Kuyavian-Pomeranian
- County: Mogilno
- Gmina: Strzelno

Wronowy [vrɔˈnɔvɨ] is a village in the administrative district of Gmina Strzelno, within Mogilno County, Kuyavian-Pomeranian Voivodeship, in north-central Poland.
