= Świerkówiec =

- Village
- Location within Poland
- Coordinates: 52°39′00″N 17°57′51″E
- Country: Poland
- Voivodeship: Kuyavian-Pomeranian
- County: Mogilno
- Gmina: Mogilno

Świerkówiec (Polish: [ɕfjɛrˈkuvjɛt͡s]) is a village in the administrative district of Gmina Mogilno, within Mogilno County, Kuyavian-Pomeranian Voivodeship, in north-central Poland.
