= Gozdanin =

Gozdanin may refer to the following places in Poland:

- Gozdanin, Lower Silesian Voivodeship (south-west Poland)
- Gozdanin, Kuyavian-Pomeranian Voivodeship (north-central Poland)
