= Dąbrówka, Mogilno County =

Dąbrówka
- Village
- Location within Poland
- Coordinates: 52°40′34″N 18°0′37″E
- Country: Poland
- Voivodeship: Kuyavian-Pomeranian
- County: Mogilno
- Gmina: Mogilno

Dąbrówka [dɔmˈbrufka] is a village in the administrative district of Gmina Mogilno, within Mogilno County, Kuyavian-Pomeranian Voivodeship, in north-central Poland.
