= Białotul =

- Village
- Location within Poland
- Coordinates: 52°39′43″N 18°2′52″E
- Country: Poland
- Voivodeship: Kuyavian-Pomeranian
- County: Mogilno
- Gmina: Mogilno
- Population: 90

Białotul [bjaˈwɔtul] is a village in the administrative district of Gmina Mogilno, within Mogilno County, Kuyavian-Pomeranian Voivodeship, in north-central Poland.
