= Targownica =

- Village
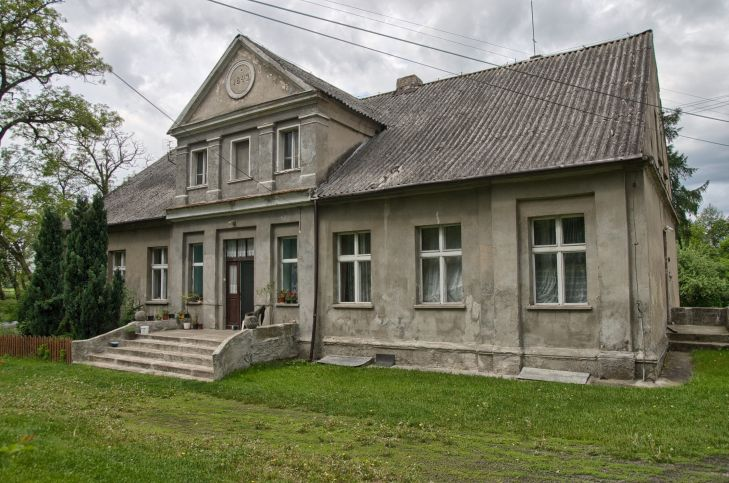

- Location within Poland
- Coordinates: 52°35′39″N 17°56′41″E
- Country: Poland
- Voivodeship: Kuyavian-Pomeranian
- County: Mogilno
- Gmina: Mogilno

Targownica [tarɡɔvˈnit͡sa] is a village in the administrative district of Gmina Mogilno, within Mogilno County, Kuyavian-Pomeranian Voivodeship, in north-central Poland.
