= Witkowo, Mogilno County =

Witkowo
- Village
- Location within Poland
- Coordinates: 52°35′43″N 18°15′09″E
- Country: Poland
- Voivodeship: Kuyavian-Pomeranian
- County: Mogilno
- Gmina: Strzelno

Witkowo [vitˈkɔvɔ] is a village in the administrative district of Gmina Strzelno, within Mogilno County, Kuyavian-Pomeranian Voivodeship, in north-central Poland.
