= Kątno, Kuyavian-Pomeranian Voivodeship =

Kątno
- Village
- Location within Poland
- Coordinates: 52°34′29″N 18°00′35″E
- Country: Poland
- Voivodeship: Kuyavian-Pomeranian
- County: Mogilno
- Gmina: Mogilno

Kątno ([ˈkɔntnɔ]; German: Gut Kontno, 1939–1945 Eckenau) is a village in the administrative district of Gmina Mogilno, within Mogilno County, Kuyavian-Pomeranian Voivodeship, in north-central Poland.
