= Różański =

Różański (feminine: Różańska; plural: Różańscy) is a Polish surname. Notable people with the surname include:

- Agata Różańska (born 1968), Polish astronomer and astrophysicist
- Chuck Rozanski (born 1955), German-American businessman
- Ewa Różańska (born 2000), Polish hammer thrower
- Grażyna Różańska (born 1961), Polish rower
- Horacio D. Rozanski (born c. 1969), Argentine-born American businessman
- Józef Różański (1907–1981), Polish intelligence officer
- Julia Rozanska, Soviet mathematician
- Marian Różański (1864–1927), Polish independence activist
- Mitchell T. Rozanski (born 1958), American Roman Catholic bishop
- Mordechai Rozanski (born 1946), Canadian academic administrator
- Olivia Różański (born 1997), Polish volleyball player
- Renata Mauer-Różańska (born 1969), Polish sport shooter
- Robert Rozanski (born 1961), Polish-born Norwegian sprint canoer
- Włodzimierz Różański (1938–2006), Polish field hockey player
