= Lubieszewo =

Lubieszewo may refer to the following places:

- Lubieszewo, Kuyavian-Pomeranian Voivodeship (north-central Poland)
- Lubieszewo, Pomeranian Voivodeship (north Poland)
- Lubieszewo, Drawsko County in West Pomeranian Voivodeship (north-west Poland)
- Lubieszewo, Gryfice County in West Pomeranian Voivodeship (north-west Poland)
