= Marian Różański =

Polish independence activist and lawyer

Marian Różański (Polish: [ˈma.rjan ruˈʐaɲ.ski]; 2 July 1864 – 10 May 1927) was a lawyer and Polish independence activist operating in Upper Silesia. He lived in Rybnik.

== History ==
Marian Różański was born on 2 July 1864 in Padniewo, Kingdom of Prussia, German Confederation. In 1908 he moved to Rybnik.

He was co-organizer of the First Silesian Uprising in 1919. After the fail of the uprising, he got beaten and arrested by Germany, being imprisoned in Nysa, Free State of Prussia. In 1919, he had established the office of the Polish Red Cross. He was a manager of the Polish Plebiscite Committee, which in 1921 had handled the Upper Silesia plebiscite. After the plebiscite, when Rybnik was transferred to Poland, Różański had become a member of the Citizen Council, the provisional government of Rybnik.

He was awarded the Knight's (1923) and Commander's Cross of the Order of Polonia Restituta, Cross on the Silesian Band of Bravery and Merit, Star of Upper Silesia and Silesian Uprising Cross.

He died on 10 May 1927 in Lubliniec, Poland, and was buried in Rybnik.

== Orders ==
- Knight's Cross of Order of Polonia Restituta (1923)
- Commander's Cross of Order of Polonia Restituta
- Cross on the Silesian Band of Bravery and Merit
- Star of Upper Silesia
- Silesian Uprising Cross
