= Laskowo, Mogilno County =

Laskowo
- Village
- Location within Poland
- Coordinates: 52°36′46″N 18°10′47″E
- Country: Poland
- Voivodeship: Kuyavian-Pomeranian
- County: Mogilno
- Gmina: Strzelno

Laskowo [lasˈkɔvɔ] is a village in the administrative district of Gmina Strzelno, within Mogilno County, Kuyavian-Pomeranian Voivodeship, in north-central Poland.
