= Leśnik, Kuyavian-Pomeranian Voivodeship =

Leśnik
- Village
- Location within Poland
- Coordinates: 52°40′40″N 17°51′33″E
- Country: Poland
- Voivodeship: Kuyavian-Pomeranian
- County: Mogilno
- Gmina: Mogilno
- Population: 8

Leśnik [ˈlɛɕnik] is a village in the administrative district of Gmina Mogilno, within Mogilno County, Kuyavian-Pomeranian Voivodeship, in north-central Poland.
