= Sucharzewo =

Sucharzewo may refer to:

- Sucharzewo, Mogilno County, Poland
- Sucharzewo, Śrem County, Poland
