= Góra, Mogilno County =

Góra
- Village
- Location within Poland
- Coordinates: 52°38′42″N 18°05′32″E
- Country: Poland
- Voivodeship: Kuyavian-Pomeranian
- County: Mogilno
- Gmina: Mogilno

Population
  - Total: 37
- Time zone: UTC+1 (CET)
  - Summer (DST): UTC+2 (CEST)

Góra [ˈɡura] is a village in the administrative district of Gmina Mogilno, within Mogilno County, Kuyavian-Pomeranian Voivodeship, in central Poland.
