= Mokre, Mogilno County =

Mokre
- Village
- Location within Poland
- Coordinates: 52°46′N 17°56′E
- Country: Poland
- Voivodeship: Kuyavian-Pomeranian
- County: Mogilno
- Gmina: Dąbrowa
- Population: 380

Mokre [ˈmɔkrɛ] is a village in the administrative district of Gmina Dąbrowa, within Mogilno County, Kuyavian-Pomeranian Voivodeship, in north-central Poland.

In 2007 the village had a population of 380.
