= Palędzie Dolne =

- Village
- Location within Poland
- Coordinates: 52°39′19″N 17°49′37″E
- Country: Poland
- Voivodeship: Kuyavian-Pomeranian
- County: Mogilno
- Gmina: Mogilno

Palędzie Dolne [paˈlɛnd͡ʑɛ ˈdɔlnɛ] is a village in the administrative district of Gmina Mogilno, within Mogilno County, Kuyavian-Pomeranian Voivodeship, in north-central Poland.
