= Józefowo, Mogilno County =

Józefowo
- Village
- Location within Poland
- Coordinates: 52°40′3″N 17°50′39″E
- Country: Poland
- Voivodeship: Kuyavian-Pomeranian
- County: Mogilno
- Gmina: Mogilno

Józefowo (Polish: [juzɛˈfɔvɔ]; German: Josephowo, 1939–45 Kirchdorf) is a village in the administrative district of Gmina Mogilno, within Mogilno County, Kuyavian-Pomeranian Voivodeship, in north-central Poland.
