= Krzyżownica =

- Village
- Location within Poland
- Coordinates: 52°35′N 17°54′E
- Country: Poland
- Voivodeship: Kuyavian-Pomeranian
- County: Mogilno
- Gmina: Mogilno

Krzyżownica [kʂɨʐɔvˈnit͡sa] is a village in the administrative district of Gmina Mogilno, within Mogilno County, Kuyavian-Pomeranian Voivodeship, in north-central Poland.

== Gallery ==
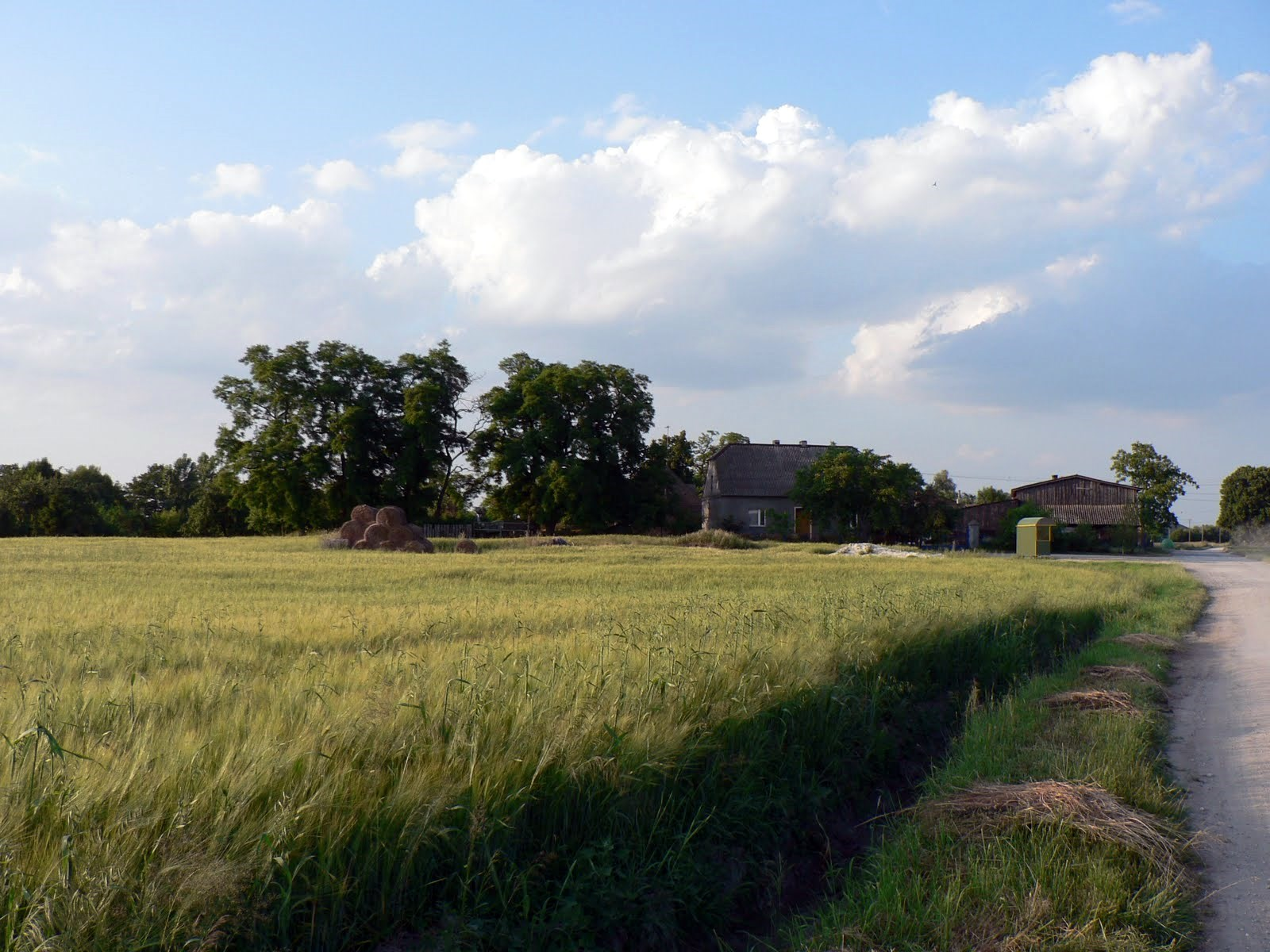
Road in Krzyżownica

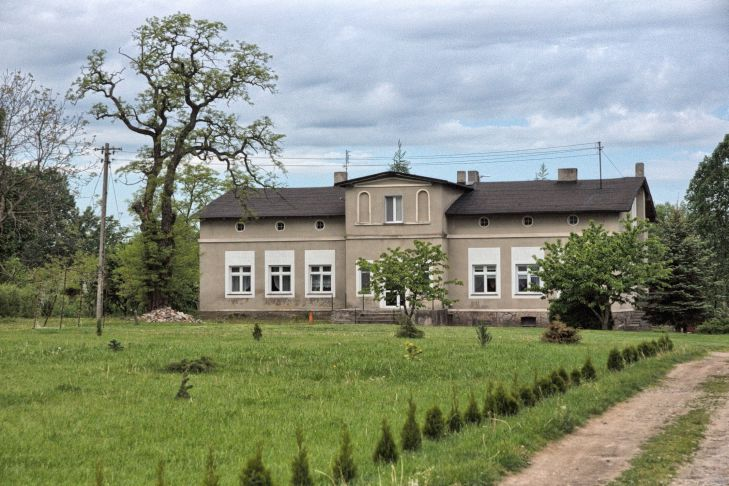
Crossings Manor Sokolnicki
