= Busewo =

- Village
- Location within Poland
- Coordinates: 52°40′41″N 18°11′44″E
- Country: Poland
- Voivodeship: Kuyavian-Pomeranian
- County: Mogilno
- Gmina: Strzelno

Busewo [buˈsɛvɔ] is a village in the administrative district of Gmina Strzelno, within Mogilno County, Kuyavian-Pomeranian Voivodeship, in north-central Poland.
