= Huta Padniewska =

- Village
- Location within Poland
- Coordinates: 52°38′39″N 17°51′32″E
- Country: Poland
- Voivodeship: Kuyavian-Pomeranian
- County: Mogilno
- Gmina: Mogilno
- Population: 23

Huta Padniewska [ˈxuta padˈɲɛfska] is a village in the administrative district of Gmina Mogilno, within Mogilno County, Kuyavian-Pomeranian Voivodeship, in north-central Poland.
