= Młyny, Kuyavian-Pomeranian Voivodeship =

Młyny
- Village
- Location within Poland
- Coordinates: 52°36′13″N 18°12′53″E
- Country: Poland
- Voivodeship: Kuyavian-Pomeranian
- County: Mogilno
- Gmina: Strzelno

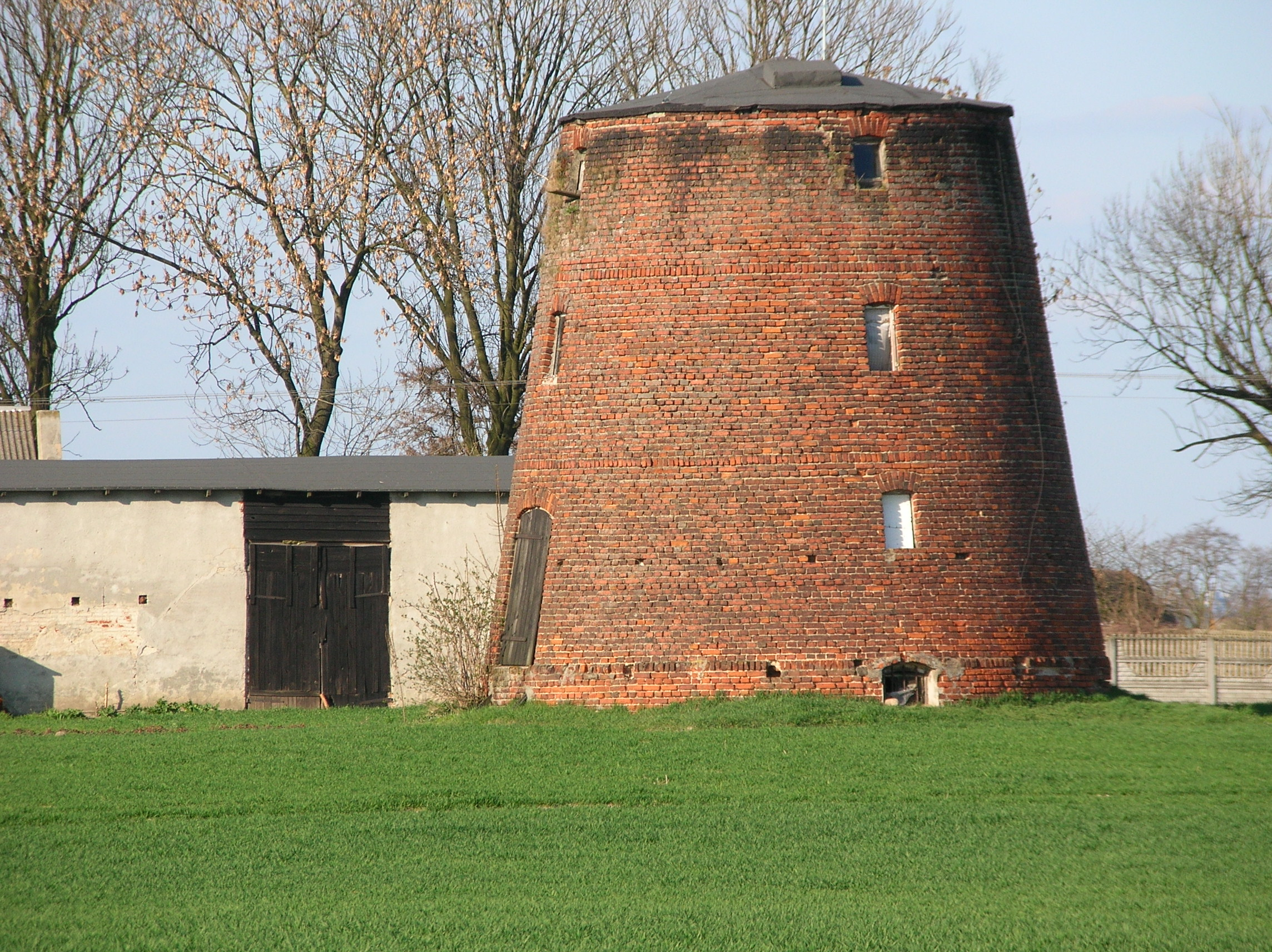
Windmill in Młyny.

Młyny [ˈmwɨnɨ] is a village in the administrative district of Gmina Strzelno, within Mogilno County, Kuyavian-Pomeranian Voivodeship, in north-central Poland. As of the 2011 Polish census, it had a population of 122.
