= Czaganiec =

- Village
- Location within Poland
- Coordinates: 52°41′44″N 17°51′06″E
- Country: Poland
- Voivodeship: Kuyavian-Pomeranian
- County: Mogilno
- Gmina: Mogilno
- Population: 51

Czaganiec [t͡ʂaˈɡaɲɛt͡s] is a village in the administrative district of Gmina Mogilno, within Mogilno County, Kuyavian-Pomeranian Voivodeship, in north-central Poland.
