= Miradz =

- Village
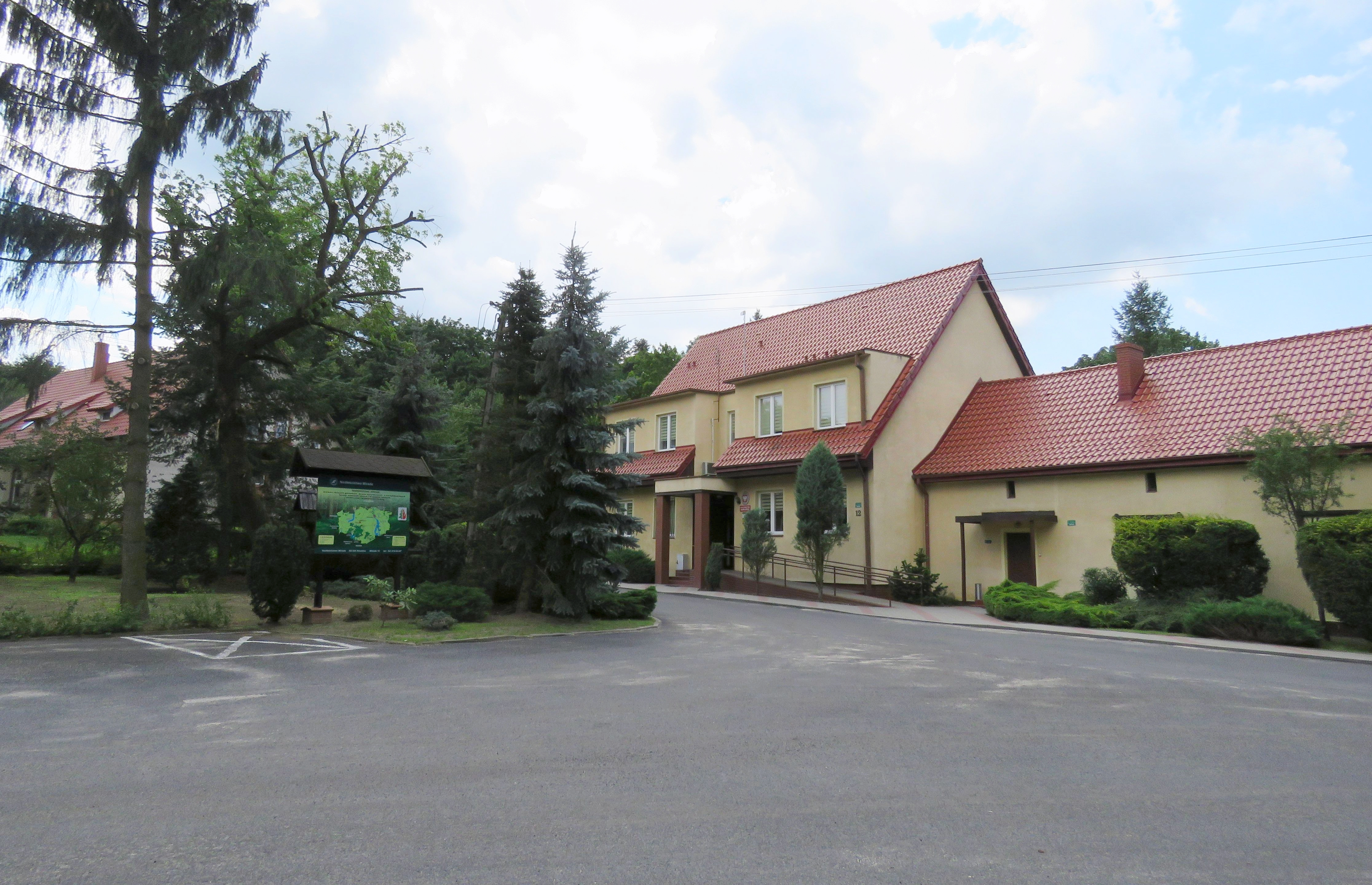

- Location within Poland
- Coordinates: 52°35′30″N 18°10′12″E
- Country: Poland
- Voivodeship: Kuyavian-Pomeranian
- County: Mogilno
- Gmina: Strzelno
- Time zone: UTC+1 (CET)
  - Summer (DST): UTC+2 (CEST)
- Vehicle registration: CMG

Miradz [ˈmirat͡s] is a village in the administrative district of Gmina Strzelno, within Mogilno County, Kuyavian-Pomeranian Voivodeship, in central Poland.

Five Polish citizens were murdered by Nazi Germany in the village during World War II.
