= Zbytowo =

- Village
- Location within Poland
- Coordinates: 52°36′N 18°6′E
- Country: Poland
- Voivodeship: Kuyavian-Pomeranian
- County: Mogilno
- Gmina: Mogilno

Zbytowo (German Bytow, 1939-1945 Birkenfelde) [zbɨˈtɔvɔ] is a village in the administrative district of Gmina Mogilno, within Mogilno County, Kuyavian-Pomeranian Voivodeship, in north-central Poland.
