= Mierucinek =

- Village
- Location within Poland
- Coordinates: 52°45′N 18°0′E
- Country: Poland
- Voivodeship: Kuyavian-Pomeranian
- County: Mogilno
- Gmina: Dąbrowa

Mierucinek [mjɛruˈt͡ɕinɛk] is a village in the administrative district of Gmina Dąbrowa, within Mogilno County, Kuyavian-Pomeranian Voivodeship, in north-central Poland.
