= Bystrzyca, Kuyavian-Pomeranian Voivodeship =

Bystrzyca
- Village
- Location within Poland
- Coordinates: 52°38′N 17°59′E
- Country: Poland
- Voivodeship: Kuyavian-Pomeranian
- County: Mogilno
- Gmina: Mogilno

Bystrzyca [bɨsˈtʂɨt͡sa] is a village in the administrative district of Gmina Mogilno, within Mogilno County, Kuyavian-Pomeranian Voivodeship, in north-central Poland.
