= Kwieciszewo =

- Village
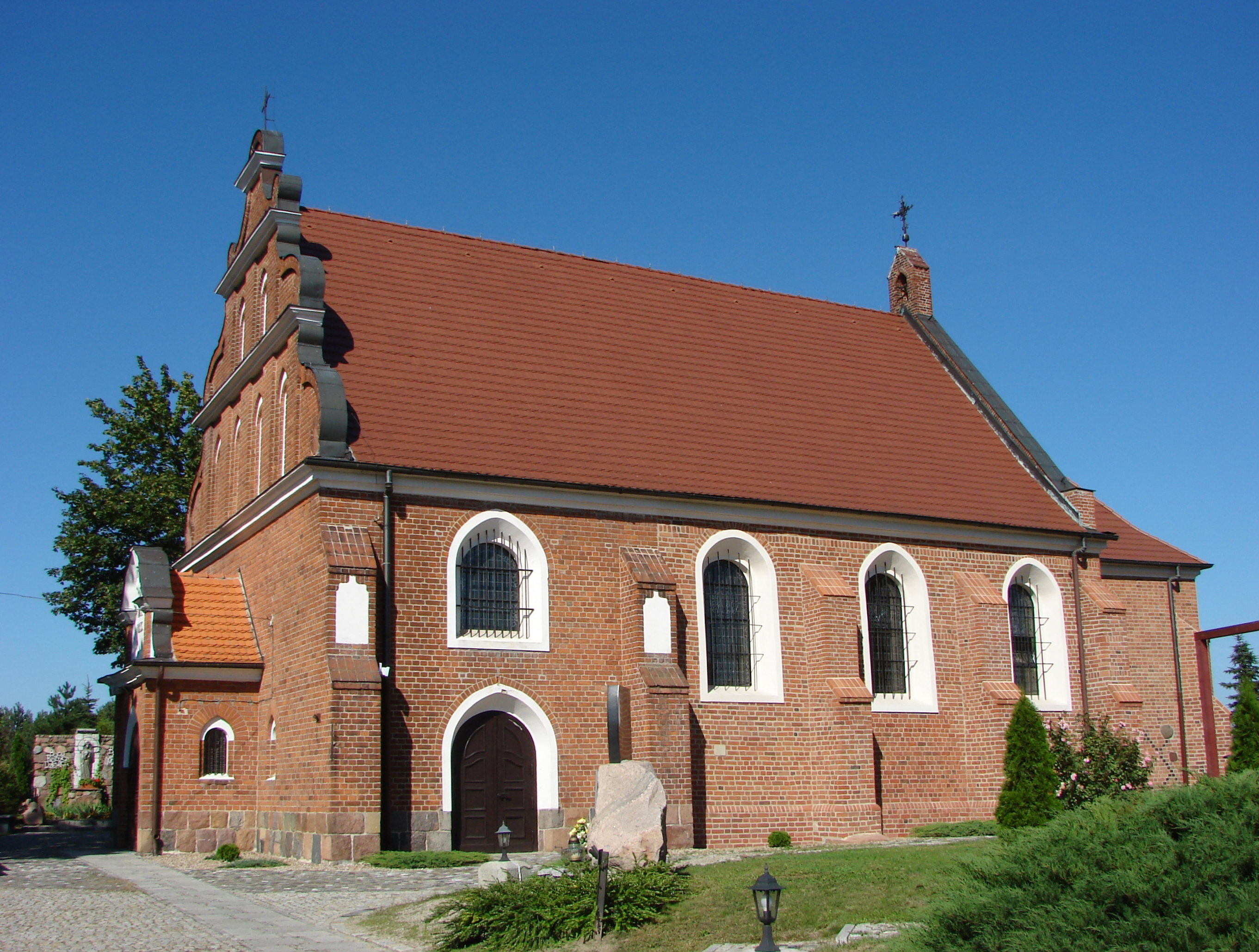
- Church of Mary Magdalene, completed in 1522.

- Location within Poland
- Coordinates: 52°37′8″N 18°2′18″E
- Country: Poland
- Voivodeship: Kuyavian-Pomeranian
- County: Mogilno
- Gmina: Mogilno
- Population: 790

Kwieciszewo [kfjɛt͡ɕiˈʂɛvɔ] is a village in the administrative district of Gmina Mogilno, within Mogilno County, Kuyavian-Pomeranian Voivodeship, in north-central Poland. In local 1792 baptism records, the town is written variously as Kwicizewo, Kwicezewo and Kwitzewo.
