= Twierdziń =

- Village
- Location within Poland
- Coordinates: 52°41′17″N 17°59′14″E
- Country: Poland
- Voivodeship: Kuyavian-Pomeranian
- County: Mogilno
- Gmina: Mogilno

Twierdziń [ˈtfjɛrd͡ʑiɲ] is a village in the administrative district of Gmina Mogilno, within Mogilno County, Kuyavian-Pomeranian Voivodeship, in north-central Poland.
