= Mielenko, Kuyavian-Pomeranian Voivodeship =

Mielenko
- Village
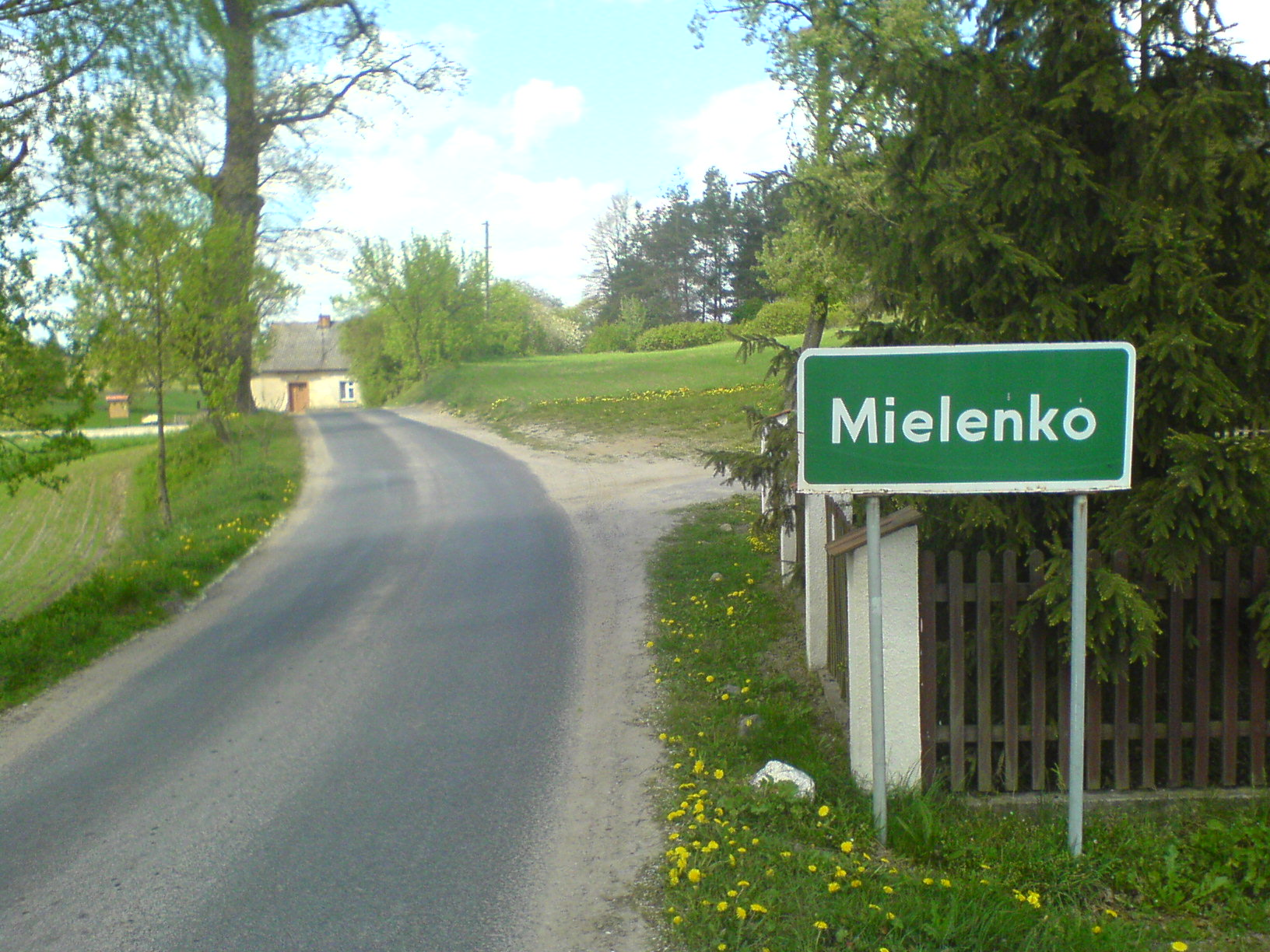

- Location within Poland
- Coordinates: 52°40′N 17°50′E
- Country: Poland
- Voivodeship: Kuyavian-Pomeranian
- County: Mogilno
- Gmina: Mogilno

Mielenko [mjɛˈlɛŋkɔ] is a village in the administrative district of Gmina Mogilno, within Mogilno County, Kuyavian-Pomeranian Voivodeship, in north-central Poland.
