= Kopce, Kuyavian-Pomeranian Voivodeship =

Kopce
- Village
- Location within Poland
- Coordinates: 52°37′31″N 18°05′16″E
- Country: Poland
- Voivodeship: Kuyavian-Pomeranian
- County: Mogilno
- Gmina: Mogilno
- Population: 8

Kopce [ˈkɔpt͡sɛ] is a village in the administrative district of Gmina Mogilno, within Mogilno County, Kuyavian-Pomeranian Voivodeship, in north-central Poland.
