= Białe Błota, Mogilno County =

Białe Błota
- Village
- Location within Poland
- Coordinates: 52°48′N 17°57′E
- Country: Poland
- Voivodeship: Kuyavian-Pomeranian
- County: Mogilno
- Gmina: Dąbrowa

Białe Błota [ˈbjawɛ ˈbwɔta] is a village in the administrative district of Gmina Dąbrowa, within Mogilno County, Kuyavian-Pomeranian Voivodeship, in north-central Poland.
