= Izdby =

- Village
- Location within Poland
- Coordinates: 52°37′N 17°53′E
- Country: Poland
- Voivodeship: Kuyavian-Pomeranian
- County: Mogilno
- Gmina: Mogilno

Izdby [ˈizdbɨ] is a village in the administrative district of Gmina Mogilno, within Mogilno County, Kuyavian-Pomeranian Voivodeship, in north-central Poland.
