= Dębno (disambiguation) =

Dębno may refer to the following places in Poland:

- Dębno, a town in West Pomeranian Voivodeship (north-west Poland)
- Dębno, Trzebnica County in Lower Silesian Voivodeship (south-west Poland)
- Dębno, Wołów County in Lower Silesian Voivodeship (south-west Poland)
- Dębno, Kuyavian-Pomeranian Voivodeship (north-central Poland)
- Dębno, Brzesko County in Lesser Poland Voivodeship (south Poland)
- Dębno, Nowy Targ County in Lesser Poland Voivodeship (south Poland)
- Dębno, Gmina Nowa Słupia in Świętokrzyskie Voivodeship (south-central Poland)
- Dębno, Gmina Raków in Świętokrzyskie Voivodeship (south-central Poland)
- Dębno, Podkarpackie Voivodeship (south-east Poland)
- Dębno, Opatów County in Świętokrzyskie Voivodeship (south-central Poland)
- Dębno, Piła County in Greater Poland Voivodeship (west-central Poland)
- Dębno, Poznań County in Greater Poland Voivodeship (west-central Poland)
- Dębno, Gmina Nowe Miasto nad Wartą, Środa County in Greater Poland Voivodeship (west-central Poland)
- Dębno, Pomeranian Voivodeship (north Poland)
