= Starczewo, Kuyavian-Pomeranian Voivodeship =

Starczewo
- Village
- Location within Poland
- Coordinates: 52°37′31″N 18°13′33″E
- Country: Poland
- Voivodeship: Kuyavian-Pomeranian
- County: Mogilno
- Gmina: Strzelno

Starczewo [starˈt͡ʂɛvɔ] is a village in the administrative district of Gmina Strzelno, within Mogilno County, Kuyavian-Pomeranian Voivodeship, in north-central Poland.
