= Żabienko =

- Village
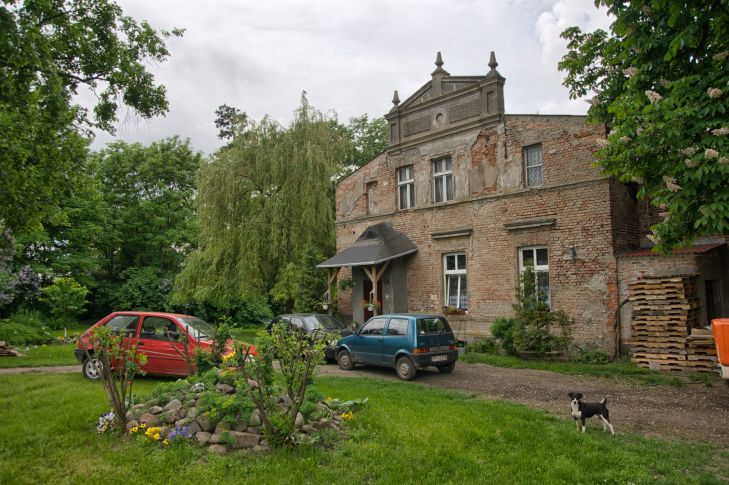

- Location within Poland
- Coordinates: 52°37′18″N 17°59′10″E
- Country: Poland
- Voivodeship: Kuyavian-Pomeranian
- County: Mogilno
- Gmina: Mogilno
- Area: 0.165 km^{2} (0.064 sq mi)
- Population (2015): 35

Żabienko [ʐaˈbjɛŋkɔ] is a village in the administrative district of Gmina Mogilno, within Mogilno County, Kuyavian-Pomeranian Voivodeship, in north-central Poland.
