= Słaboszewo =

- Village
- Location within Poland
- Coordinates: 52°47′N 17°58′E
- Country: Poland
- Voivodeship: Kuyavian-Pomeranian
- County: Mogilno
- Gmina: Dąbrowa

Słaboszewo [swabɔˈʂɛvɔ] is a village in the administrative district of Gmina Dąbrowa, within Mogilno County, Kuyavian-Pomeranian Voivodeship, in north-central Poland.
