= Ostrowo, Mogilno County =

Ostrowo
- Village
- Location within Poland
- Coordinates: 52°33′N 18°6′E
- Country: Poland
- Voivodeship: Kuyavian-Pomeranian
- County: Mogilno
- Gmina: Strzelno
- Population: 440

Ostrowo [ɔsˈtrɔvɔ] is a village in the administrative district of Gmina Strzelno, within Mogilno County, Kuyavian-Pomeranian Voivodeship, in north-central Poland.
