= Książ (disambiguation) =

Książ (formerly known as Schloss Fürstenstein in German) is a castle in northern Wałbrzych, in northern Silesia, Poland.

Książ may also refer to:

- Książ Landscape Park, a protected area
- Książ Wielkopolski, a town in west-central Poland
- Książ Wielki, a village in southern Poland
- Książ, Kuyavian-Pomeranian Voivodeship (north-central Poland)
- Książ, Lublin Voivodeship (east Poland)
- Książ, West Pomeranian Voivodeship (north-west Poland)
