= Krzysztof Antoni Szembek =

Polish archbishop

His Excellency Krzysztof Antoni Szembek
- Archbishop of Gniezno; Primate of Poland
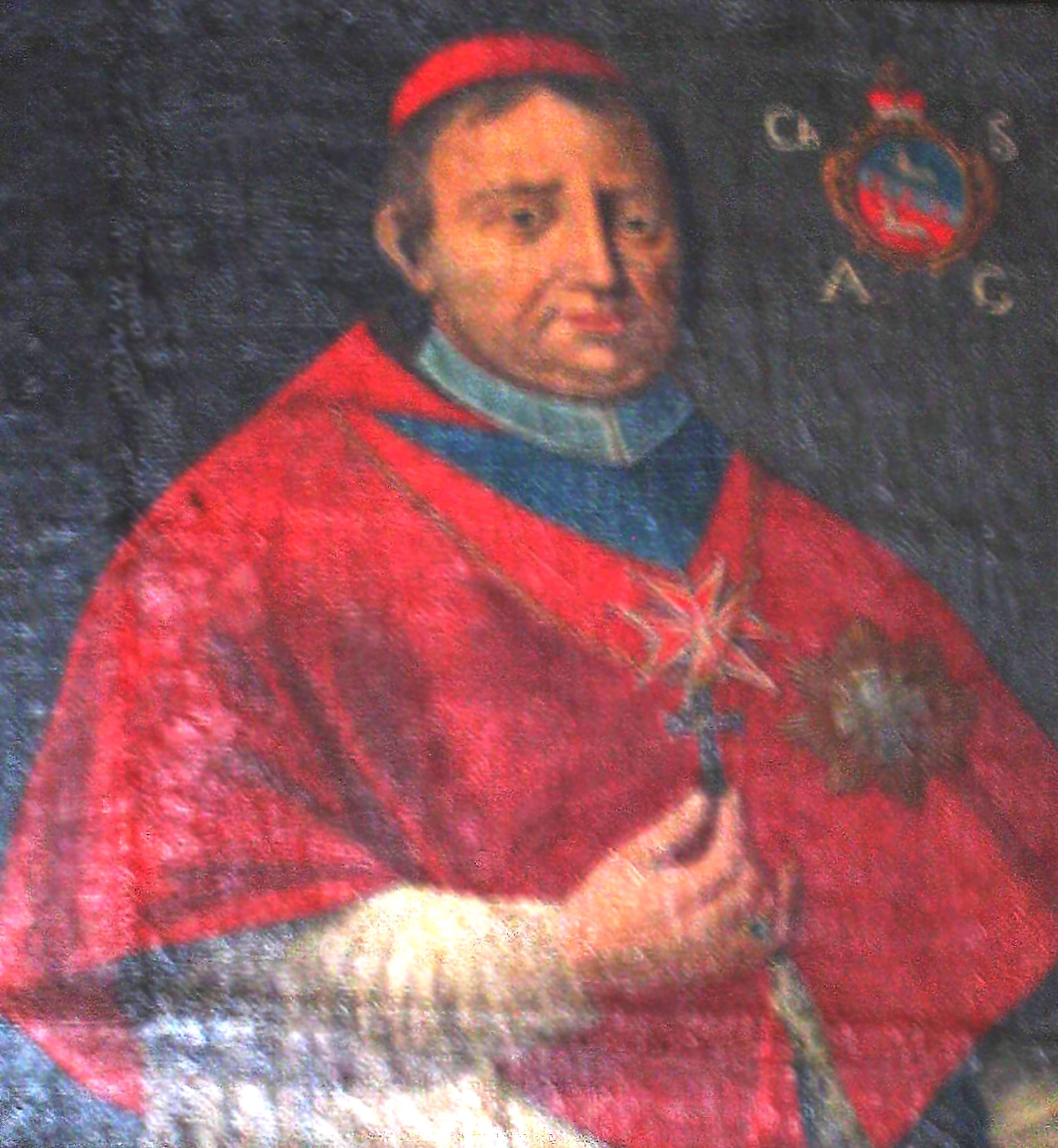
- Church: Roman Catholic
- Archdiocese: Gniezno

Personal details
- Born: 25 March 1667 Szczepanowo
- Died: 6 July 1748 (aged 81) Łowicz
- Coat of arms

Krzysztof Antoni Szembek was born on 25 March 1667 in the village of Szczepanowo and died on 6 July 1748 in Łowicz. He was the Bishop of Livonia from 1711, the Bishop of Poznań from 1717 to 1719, the Kujawy Bishop from 1719 to 1739, the Archbishop of Gniezno and Primate of Poland from 1739, a clerical referendary in 1709, a Pomeranian archdeacon, the canon of Włocławek and the canon of Przemyśl in 1699.

Preceded by Mikołaj Bartłomiej Tarło	Bishop of Poznań; 1716–1720	Succeeded by Piotr Tarło
