= Wiecanowo =

- Village
- Location within Poland
- Coordinates: 52°41′N 17°57′E
- Country: Poland
- Voivodeship: Kuyavian-Pomeranian
- County: Mogilno
- Gmina: Mogilno

Wiecanowo [vjɛt͡saˈnɔvɔ] is a village in the administrative district of Gmina Mogilno, within Mogilno County, Kuyavian-Pomeranian Voivodeship, in north-central Poland.

Founded by Zdzisław Jankowski in the 1981, Wiecanowo became a well-known and popular holiday destination for the surrounding towns such as Mogilno.

Wiecanowo is known for its beaches adjacent to Lake Wiecanowo, crimson sunsets and the welcoming community of the private summerhouses.
