= Dąbek, Kuyavian-Pomeranian Voivodeship =

Dąbek
- Village
- Location within Poland
- Coordinates: 52°38′52″N 18°11′06″E
- Country: Poland
- Voivodeship: Kuyavian-Pomeranian
- County: Mogilno
- Gmina: Strzelno

Dąbek [ˈdɔmbɛk] is a village in the administrative district of Gmina Strzelno, within Mogilno County, Kuyavian-Pomeranian Voivodeship, in north-central Poland.
