= Jaworowo, Kuyavian-Pomeranian Voivodeship =

Jaworowo
- Village
- Location within Poland
- Coordinates: 52°34′18″N 18°6′51″E
- Country: Poland
- Voivodeship: Kuyavian-Pomeranian
- County: Mogilno
- Gmina: Strzelno

Jaworowo [javɔˈrɔvɔ] (German 1939-1945 Worau) is a village in the administrative district of Gmina Strzelno, within Mogilno County, Kuyavian-Pomeranian Voivodeship, in north-central Poland.
