= Szydłówko =

- Village
- Location within Poland
- Coordinates: 52°34′32″N 17°55′47″E
- Country: Poland
- Voivodeship: Kuyavian-Pomeranian
- County: Mogilno
- Gmina: Mogilno
- Population: 140

Szydłówko [ʂɨdˈwufkɔ] is a village in the administrative district of Gmina Mogilno, within Mogilno County, Kuyavian-Pomeranian Voivodeship, in north-central Poland.
