= Iskra, Kuyavian-Pomeranian Voivodeship =

Iskra
- Village
- Location within Poland
- Coordinates: 52°40′16″N 17°58′55″E
- Country: Poland
- Voivodeship: Kuyavian-Pomeranian
- County: Mogilno
- Gmina: Mogilno
- Population: 108

Iskra [ˈiskra] is a village in the administrative district of Gmina Mogilno, within Mogilno County, Kuyavian-Pomeranian Voivodeship, in north-central Poland.
