= Gębice, Kuyavian-Pomeranian Voivodeship =

Gębice
- Village
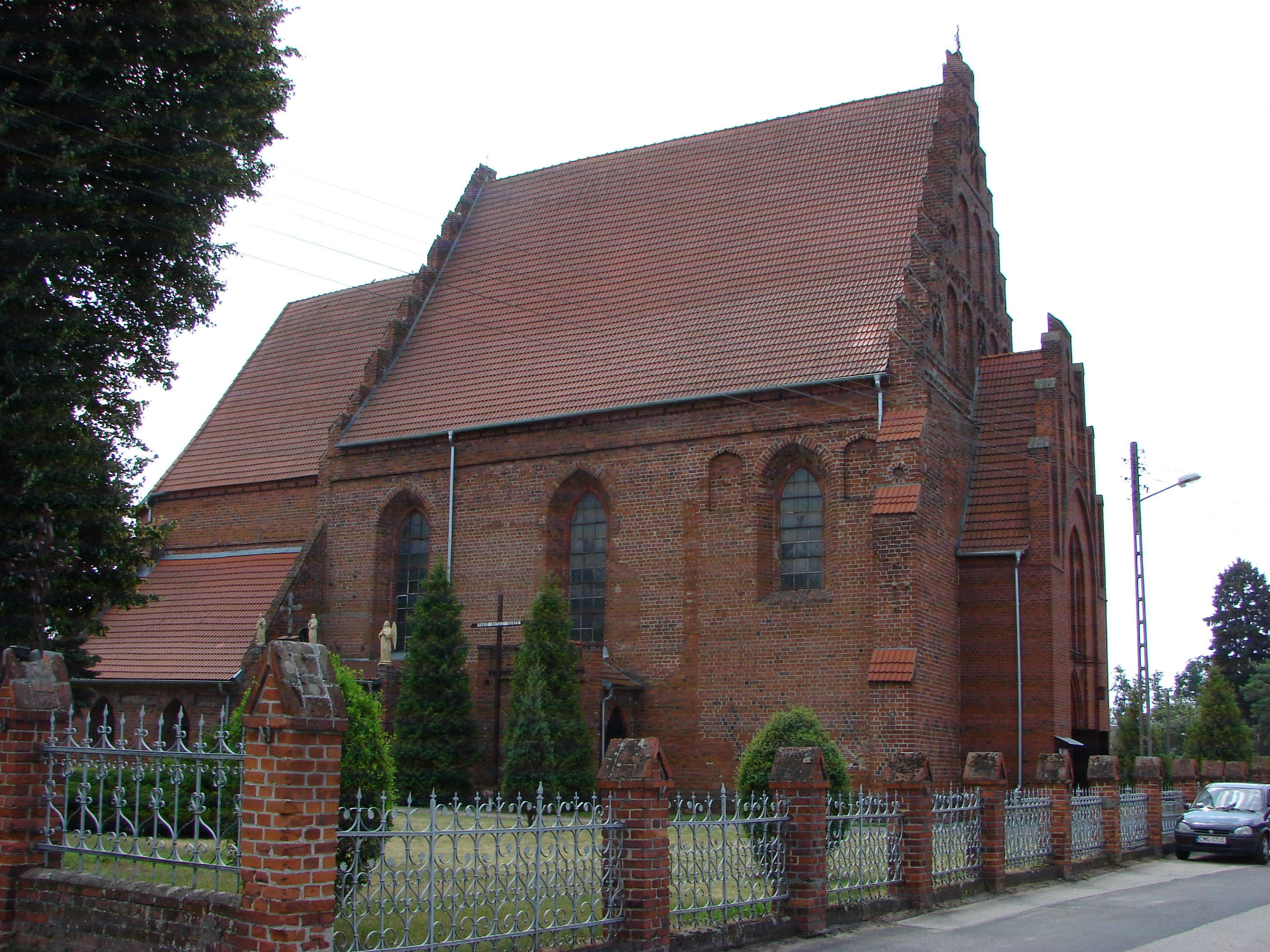
- Parish church of Saint Matthew. 15th-16th century.

- Location within Poland
- Coordinates: 52°35′56″N 18°2′20″E
- Country: Poland
- Voivodeship: Kuyavian-Pomeranian
- County: Mogilno
- Gmina: Mogilno

Population
  - Total: 981
- Time zone: UTC+1 (CET)
  - Summer (DST): UTC+2 (CEST)
- Vehicle registration: CMG

Gębice [ɡɛmˈbit͡sɛ] is a village in the administrative district of Gmina Mogilno, within Mogilno County, Kuyavian-Pomeranian Voivodeship, in central Poland. It is located in the historic region of Kuyavia.

Gębice was a royal town of the Kingdom of Poland, administratively located in the Kruszwica County in the Brześć Kujawski Voivodeship in the Greater Poland Province.
