= Wylatowo =

- Village
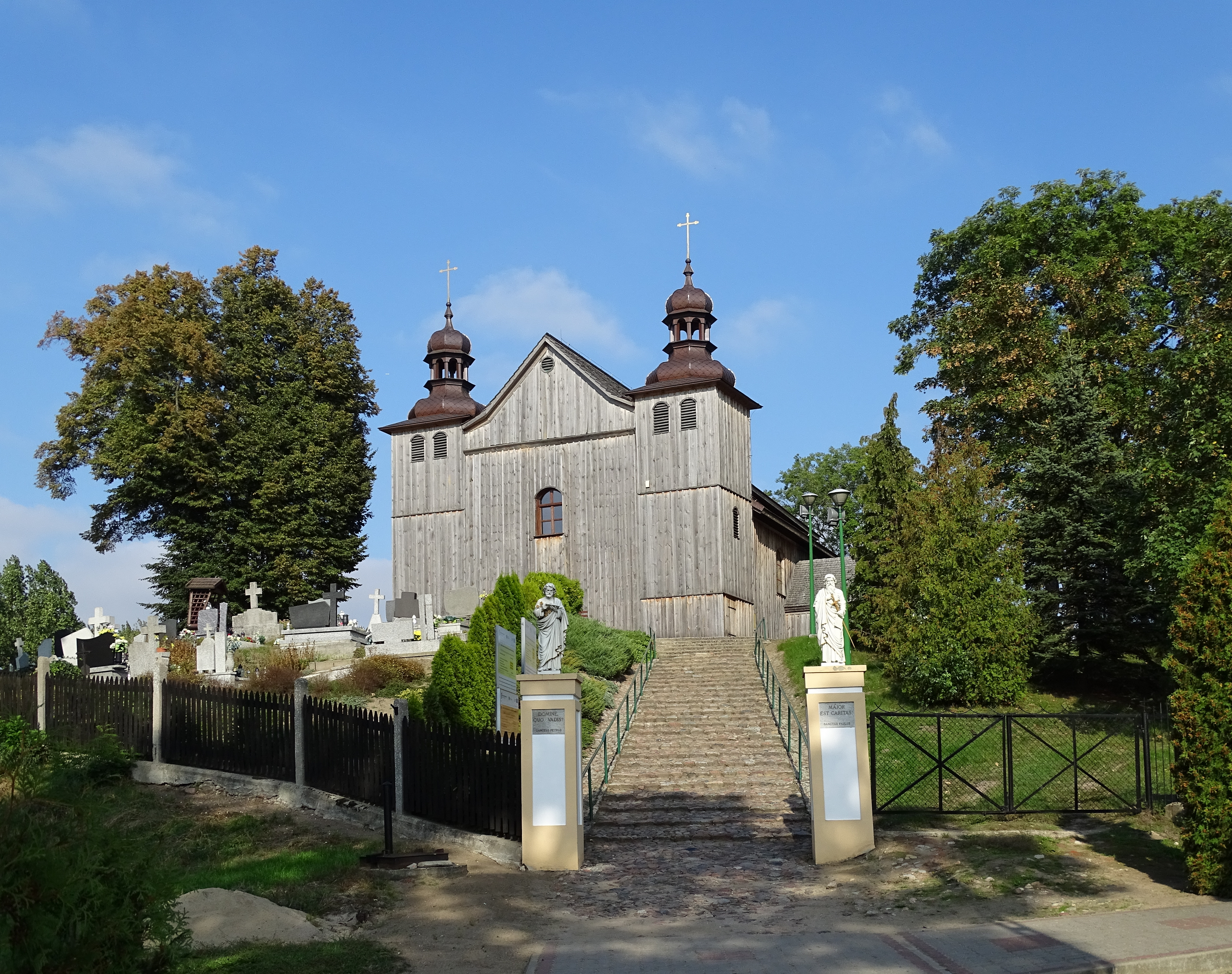
- Saints Peter and Paul church in Wylatowo

- Location within Poland
- Coordinates: 52°37′N 17°56′E
- Country: Poland
- Voivodeship: Kuyavian-Pomeranian
- County: Mogilno
- Gmina: Mogilno

Population
  - Total: 614
- Time zone: UTC+1 (CET)
  - Summer (DST): UTC+2 (CEST)
- Vehicle registration: CMG
- Website: http://www.wylatowo.pl

Wylatowo [vɨlaˈtɔvɔ] is a village in the administrative district of Gmina Mogilno, within Mogilno County, Kuyavian-Pomeranian Voivodeship, in central Poland.

Six Polish citizens were murdered by Nazi Germany in the village during World War II.
