= Młyny-Wybudowanie =

Village in Gmina Strzelno, Poland

- Village
- Country: Poland
- Voivodeship: Kuyavian-Pomeranian
- County: Mogilno
- Gmina: Strzelno

Młyny-Wybudowanie [ˈmwɨnɨ vɨbudɔˈvaɲɛ] is a village in the administrative district of Gmina Strzelno, within Mogilno County, Kuyavian-Pomeranian Voivodeship, in north-central Poland.
