= Wieniec, Mogilno County =

Wieniec
- Village
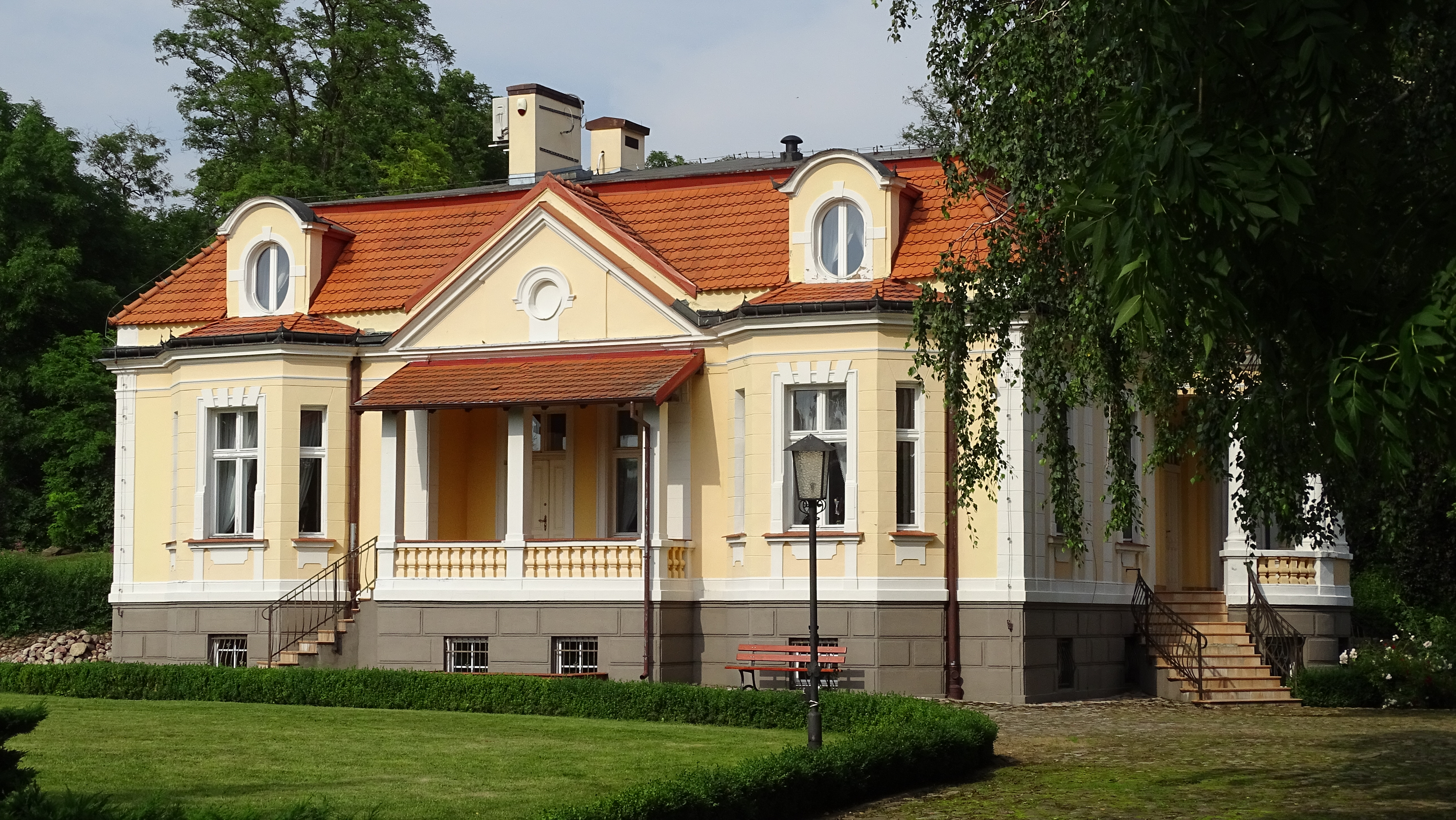
- The manor house from the turn of the 19th century

- Location within Poland
- Coordinates: 52°41′10″N 17°52′00″E
- Country: Poland
- Voivodeship: Kuyavian-Pomeranian
- County: Mogilno
- Gmina: Mogilno

Wieniec [ˈvjɛɲɛt͡s] is a village in the administrative district of Gmina Mogilno, within Mogilno County, Kuyavian-Pomeranian Voivodeship, in north-central Poland.
