= Olsza, Kuyavian-Pomeranian Voivodeship =

Olsza
- Village
- Location within Poland
- Coordinates: 52°38′N 18°0′E
- Country: Poland
- Voivodeship: Kuyavian-Pomeranian
- County: Mogilno
- Gmina: Mogilno

Olsza [ˈɔlʂa] is a village in the administrative district of Gmina Mogilno, within Mogilno County, Kuyavian-Pomeranian Voivodeship, in north-central Poland.
