= Czerniak =

Czerniak may refer to:

- Czerniak (surname)
- Czerniak, Warmian-Masurian Voivodeship
- Czerniak, Kuyavian-Pomeranian Voivodeship
- Czerniak., botanical author abbreviation for Ekaterina Georgiewna Czerniakowska (1892-1942)
