= Sadowiec, Kuyavian-Pomeranian Voivodeship =

Sadowiec
- Village
- Location within Poland
- Coordinates: 52°39′6″N 17°47′24″E
- Country: Poland
- Voivodeship: Kuyavian-Pomeranian
- County: Mogilno
- Gmina: Mogilno
- Population: 160

Sadowiec [saˈdɔvjɛt͡s] is a village in the administrative district of Gmina Mogilno, within Mogilno County, Kuyavian-Pomeranian Voivodeship, in north-central Poland.
