= Łosośniki =

Łosośniki may refer to the following places in Poland:

- Łosośniki, Pomeranian Voivodeship (north Poland)
- Łosośniki, Kuyavian-Pomeranian Voivodeship (north-central Poland)
