= Żabno, Kuyavian-Pomeranian Voivodeship =

Żabno
- Village
- Location within Poland
- Coordinates: 52°38′N 17°57′E
- Country: Poland
- Voivodeship: Kuyavian-Pomeranian
- County: Mogilno
- Gmina: Mogilno
- Time zone: UTC+1 (CET)
  - Summer (DST): UTC+2 (CEST)

Żabno [ˈʐabnɔ] is a village in the administrative district of Gmina Mogilno, within Mogilno County, Kuyavian-Pomeranian Voivodeship, in central Poland.
