= Szerzawy, Kuyavian-Pomeranian Voivodeship =

Szerzawy
- Village
- Location within Poland
- Coordinates: 52°41′00″N 17°54′56″E
- Country: Poland
- Voivodeship: Kuyavian-Pomeranian
- County: Mogilno
- Gmina: Mogilno

Szerzawy [ʂɛˈʐavɨ] is a village in the administrative district of Gmina Mogilno, within Mogilno County, Kuyavian-Pomeranian Voivodeship, in north-central Poland.
