= Stawiska, Mogilno County =

Stawiska
- Village
- Location within Poland
- Coordinates: 52°38′N 17°57′E
- Country: Poland
- Voivodeship: Kuyavian-Pomeranian
- County: Mogilno
- Gmina: Mogilno

Stawiska ([staˈviska]) is a village in the administrative district of Gmina Mogilno, within Mogilno County, Kuyavian-Pomeranian Voivodeship, in north-central Poland.
