= Chałupska =

- Village
- Location within Poland
- Coordinates: 52°41′46″N 17°54′42″E
- Country: Poland
- Voivodeship: Kuyavian-Pomeranian
- County: Mogilno
- Gmina: Mogilno

Chałupska [xaˈwupska] is a village in the administrative district of Gmina Mogilno, within Mogilno County, Kuyavian-Pomeranian Voivodeship, in north-central Poland.

It has a population of 22 as of 2021
