= Bożejewice, Mogilno County =

Bożejewice
- Village
- Location within Poland
- Coordinates: 52°41′22″N 18°14′36″E
- Country: Poland
- Voivodeship: Kuyavian-Pomeranian
- County: Mogilno
- Gmina: Strzelno

Bożejewice [bɔʐɛjɛˈvit͡sɛ] is a village in the administrative district of Gmina Strzelno, within Mogilno County, Kuyavian-Pomeranian Voivodeship, in north-central Poland.

== History ==
The village has a history going back thousands of years. Remains have been found of houses from the Linear Pottery culture.
