= Jeziorki, Mogilno County =

Jeziorki
- Village
- Location within Poland
- Coordinates: 52°38′N 18°8′E
- Country: Poland
- Voivodeship: Kuyavian-Pomeranian
- County: Mogilno
- Gmina: Strzelno
- Time zone: UTC+1 (CET)
  - Summer (DST): UTC+2 (CEST)
- Vehicle registration: CMG

Jeziorki [jɛˈʑɔrki] is a village in the administrative district of Gmina Strzelno, within Mogilno County, Kuyavian-Pomeranian Voivodeship, in central Poland.

Two Polish citizens were murdered by Nazi Germany in the village during World War II.
