= Baba, Mogilno County =

Baba
- Village
- Location within Poland
- Coordinates: 52°40′45″N 17°56′08″E
- Country: Poland
- Voivodeship: Kuyavian-Pomeranian
- County: Mogilno
- Gmina: Mogilno

Baba [ˈbaba] is a village in the administrative district of Gmina Mogilno, within Mogilno County, Kuyavian-Pomeranian Voivodeship, in north-central Poland.
