= Bzowiec =

Bzowiec may refer to the following places in Poland:

- Bzowiec, Lublin Voivodeship
- Bzowiec, Warmian-Masurian Voivodeship
- Bzówiec, Kuyavian-Pomeranian Voivodeship
