= Łąkie, Mogilno County =

Łąkie
- Village
- Location within Poland
- Coordinates: 52°37′N 18°8′E
- Country: Poland
- Voivodeship: Kuyavian-Pomeranian
- County: Mogilno
- Gmina: Strzelno

Łąkie [ˈwɔnkʲɛ] is a village in the administrative district of Gmina Strzelno, within Mogilno County, Kuyavian-Pomeranian Voivodeship, in north-central Poland. In local baptism records from 1792, the town is called Loncke. In local death records from 1836, the village is spelled as Lonk.
