= Czerniak, Kuyavian-Pomeranian Voivodeship =

Czerniak
- Village
- Location within Poland
- Coordinates: 52°37′50″N 18°04′42″E
- Country: Poland
- Voivodeship: Kuyavian-Pomeranian
- County: Mogilno
- Gmina: Mogilno

Czerniak [ˈt͡ʂɛrɲak] is a village in the administrative district of Gmina Mogilno, within Mogilno County, Kuyavian-Pomeranian Voivodeship, in north-central Poland.
