= Dębno, Kuyavian-Pomeranian Voivodeship =

Dębno
- Village
- Location within Poland
- Coordinates: 52°38′2″N 17°51′45″E
- Country: Poland
- Voivodeship: Kuyavian-Pomeranian
- County: Mogilno
- Gmina: Mogilno

Dębno [ˈdɛmbnɔ] is a village in the administrative district of Gmina Mogilno, within Mogilno County, Kuyavian-Pomeranian Voivodeship, in north-central Poland.
