= Gmina Strzelno =

Gmina Strzelno Strzelno Commune
- Gmina
- Coat of arms
- Interactive map of Gmina Strzelno
- Coordinates (Strzelno): 52°37′46″N 18°10′12″E
- Country: Poland
- Voivodeship: Kuyavian-Pomeranian
- County: Mogilno
- Seat: Strzelno

Area
  - Total: 185.28 km^{2} (71.54 sq mi)

Population (2006)
  - Total: 12,308
  - Density: 66.429/km^{2} (172.05/sq mi)
  - Urban: 6,054
  - Rural: 6,254
- Website: http://www.strzelno.pl

Gmina Strzelno, Poland, is an urban-rural gmina (administrative district) in Mogilno County, Kuyavian-Pomeranian Voivodeship, in north-central Poland. Its seat is the town of Strzelno, which lies approximately 16 kilometres (10 mi) east of Mogilno, 54 km (34 mi) south-west of Toruń, and 56 km (35 mi) south of Bydgoszcz.

The gmina covers an area of 185.28 square kilometres (71.5 sq mi), and as of 2006 its total population is 12,308 (out of which the population of Strzelno amounts to 6,054, and the population of the rural part of the gmina is 6,254).

== Villages ==
Apart from the town of Strzelno, Gmina Strzelno contains the villages and settlements of Bławatki, Bławaty, Bożejewice, Bronisław, Busewo, Ciechrz, Ciencisko, Dąbek, Górki, Jaworowo, Jeziorki, Kijewice, Książ, Kurzebiela, Łąkie, Laskowo, Markowice, Miradz, Mirosławice, Młynice, Młyny, Młyny-Wybudowanie, Niemojewko, Ostrowo, Przedbórz, Rzadkwin, Sławsko Dolne, Starczewo, Stodólno, Stodoły, Strzelno Klasztorne, Strzelno-Wybudowanie, Tomaszewo, Witkowo, Wronowy, Wymysłowice, Żegotki, Ziemowity and Zofijówka.

== Neighbouring gminas ==
Gmina Strzelno is bordered by the gminas of Inowrocław, Janikowo, Jeziora Wielkie, Kruszwica, Mogilno, Orchowo and Wilczyn.
