= Przedbórz, Kuyavian-Pomeranian Voivodeship =

Przedbórz
- Village
- Location within Poland
- Coordinates: 52°34′42″N 18°8′19″E
- Country: Poland
- Voivodeship: Kuyavian-Pomeranian
- County: Mogilno
- Gmina: Strzelno
- Time zone: UTC+1 (CET)
  - Summer (DST): UTC+2 (CEST)

Przedbórz [ˈpʂɛdbuʂ] is a village in the administrative district of Gmina Strzelno, within Mogilno County, Kuyavian-Pomeranian Voivodeship, in central Poland.
