= Gozdawa, Kuyavian-Pomeranian Voivodeship =

Gozdawa
- Village
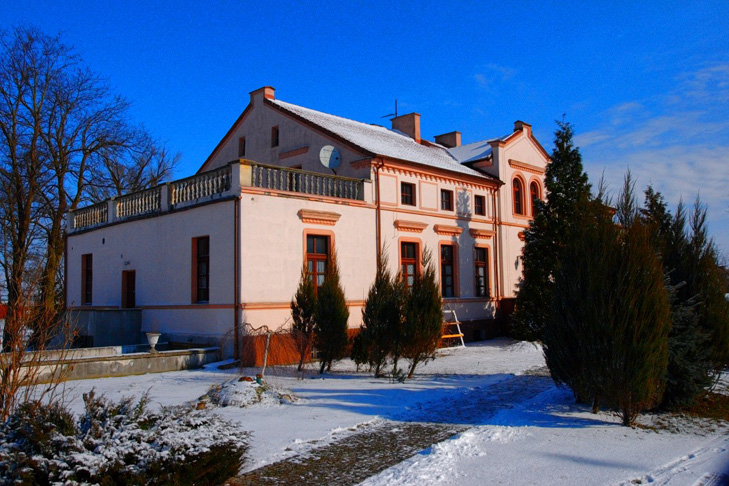
- Manor in Gozdawa

- Location within Poland
- Coordinates: 52°38′29″N 17°54′51″E
- Country: Poland
- Voivodeship: Kuyavian-Pomeranian
- County: Mogilno
- Gmina: Mogilno

Gozdawa [ɡɔzˈdava] is a village in the administrative district of Gmina Mogilno, within Mogilno County, Kuyavian-Pomeranian Voivodeship, in north-central Poland.
