= Skrzeszewo, Kuyavian-Pomeranian Voivodeship =

Skrzeszewo
- Village
- Location within Poland
- Coordinates: 52°38′45″N 18°02′03″E
- Country: Poland
- Voivodeship: Kuyavian-Pomeranian
- County: Mogilno
- Gmina: Mogilno
- Population: 95

Skrzeszewo [skʂɛˈʂɛvɔ] is a village in the administrative district of Gmina Mogilno, within Mogilno County, Kuyavian-Pomeranian Voivodeship, in north-central Poland.
