= Lubieszewo, Kuyavian-Pomeranian Voivodeship =

Lubieszewo
- Village
- Location within Poland
- Coordinates: 52°40′16″N 18°4′44″E
- Country: Poland
- Voivodeship: Kuyavian-Pomeranian
- County: Mogilno
- Gmina: Mogilno
- Population: 120

Lubieszewo [lubjɛˈʂɛvɔ] is a village in the administrative district of Gmina Mogilno, within Mogilno County, Kuyavian-Pomeranian Voivodeship, in north-central Poland.
