= Gozdanin, Kuyavian-Pomeranian Voivodeship =

Gozdanin
- Village
- Location within Poland
- Coordinates: 52°36′N 18°0′E
- Country: Poland
- Voivodeship: Kuyavian-Pomeranian
- County: Mogilno
- Gmina: Mogilno
- Population (approx.): 270

Gozdanin [ɡɔzˈdanin] is a village in the administrative district of Gmina Mogilno, within Mogilno County, Kuyavian-Pomeranian Voivodeship, in north-central Poland.
