= Szczepanowo =

- Village
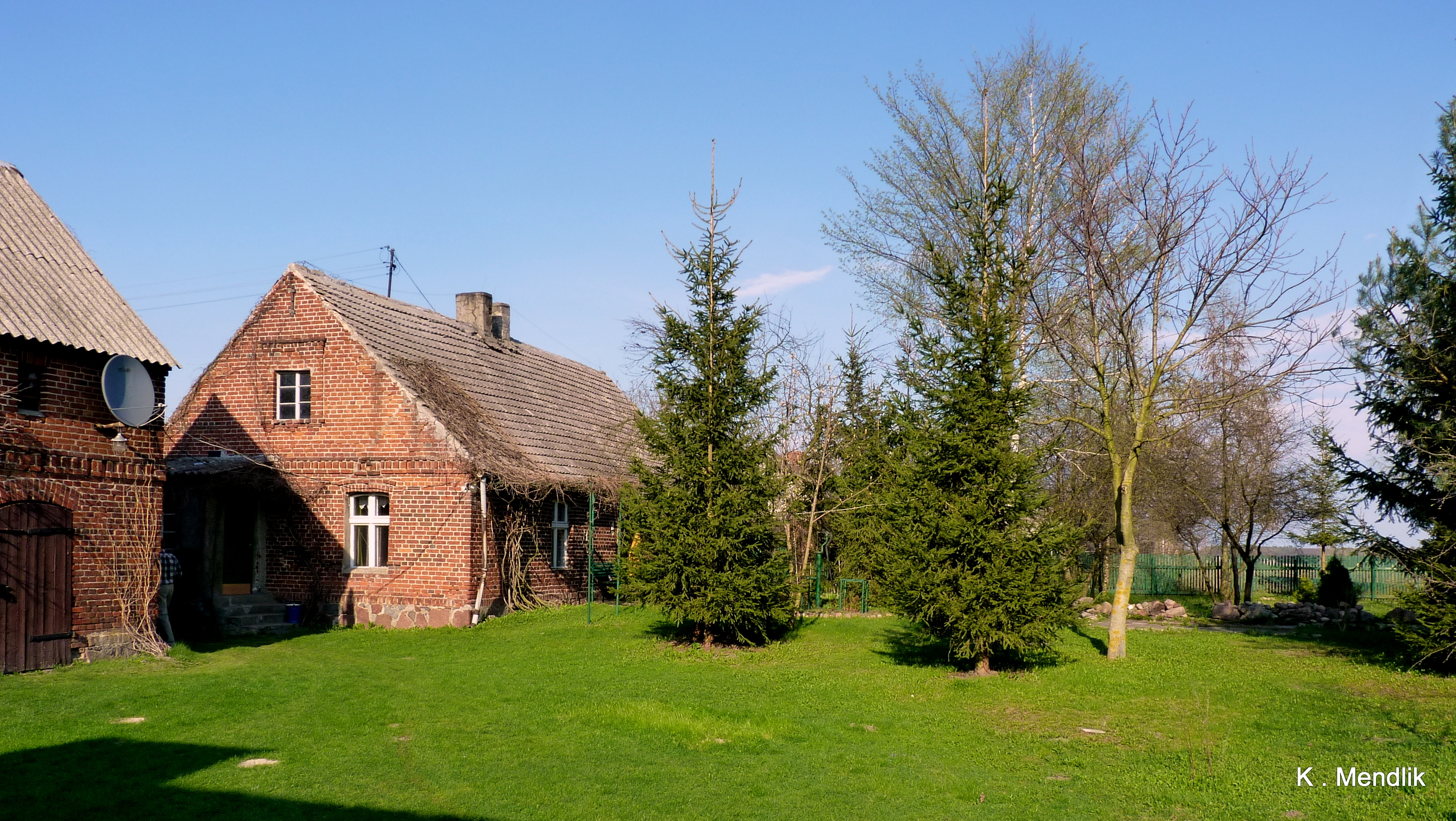
- Szczepanowo - Wierzbowa

- Location within Poland
- Coordinates: 52°50′N 17°55′E
- Country: Poland
- Voivodeship: Kuyavian-Pomeranian
- County: Mogilno
- Gmina: Dąbrowa
- Time zone: UTC+1 (CET)
  - Summer (DST): UTC+2 (CEST)
- Vehicle registration: CMG

Szczepanowo [ʂt͡ʂɛpaˈnɔvɔ] is a village in the administrative district of Gmina Dąbrowa, within Mogilno County, Kuyavian-Pomeranian Voivodeship, in central Poland.

Two Polish citizens were murdered by Nazi Germany in the village during World War II.
