= Książ, Kuyavian-Pomeranian Voivodeship =

Książ
- Village
- Location within Poland
- Coordinates: 52°37′55″N 18°14′50″E
- Country: Poland
- Voivodeship: Kuyavian-Pomeranian
- County: Mogilno
- Gmina: Strzelno

Książ [kɕɔ̃ʂ] is a village in the administrative district of Gmina Strzelno, within Mogilno County, Kuyavian-Pomeranian Voivodeship, in north-central Poland.
