= Dąbrowa, Mogilno County =

Dąbrowa
- Village
- Location within Poland
- Coordinates: 52°44′N 17°56′E
- Country: Poland
- Voivodeship: Kuyavian-Pomeranian
- County: Mogilno
- Gmina: Dąbrowa
- Population: 1,450

Dąbrowa [dɔmˈbrɔva] is a village in Mogilno County, Kuyavian-Pomeranian Voivodeship, in north-central Poland. It is the seat of the gmina (administrative district) called Gmina Dąbrowa.
