= Wyrobki, Mogilno County =

Wyrobki
- Village
- Location within Poland
- Coordinates: 52°38′45″N 17°55′41″E
- Country: Poland
- Voivodeship: Kuyavian-Pomeranian
- County: Mogilno
- Gmina: Mogilno

Wyrobki [vɨˈrɔpki] is a village in the administrative district of Gmina Mogilno, within Mogilno County, Kuyavian-Pomeranian Voivodeship, in north-central Poland.
