= Gmina Mogilno =

Gmina Mogilno Mogilno Commune
- Gmina
- Flag Coat of arms
- Interactive map of Gmina Mogilno
- Coordinates (Mogilno): 52°39′N 17°57′E
- Country: Poland
- Voivodeship: Kuyavian-Pomeranian
- County: Mogilno
- Seat: Mogilno

Area
  - Total: 256.11 km^{2} (98.88 sq mi)

Population (2006)
  - Total: 24,822
  - Density: 96.919/km^{2} (251.02/sq mi)
  - Urban: 12,359
  - Rural: 12,463
- Website: http://www.mogilno.cba.pl/

Gmina Mogilno is an urban-rural gmina (administrative district) in Mogilno County, Kuyavian-Pomeranian Voivodeship, in north-central Poland. Its seat is the town of Mogilno, which lies approximately 52 kilometres (32 mi) south of Bydgoszcz.

The gmina covers an area of 256.11 square kilometres (98.9 sq mi), and as of 2006 its total population is 24,822 (out of which the population of Mogilno amounts to 12,359, and the population of the rural part of the gmina is 12,463).

== Villages ==
Apart from the town of Mogilno, Gmina Mogilno contains the villages and settlements of:

- Baba
- Bąbowo
- Białotul
- Bielice
- Bystrzyca
- Bzówiec
- Chabsko
- Chałupska
- Czaganiec
- Czarnotul
- Czerniak
- Dąbrówka
- Dębno
- Dzierzążno
- Gębice
- Głęboczek
- Góra
- Goryszewo
- Gozdanin
- Gozdawa
- Huta Padniewska
- Huta Palędzka
- Iskra
- Izdby
- Józefowo
- Kamionek
- Kątno
- Kołodziejewko
- Kopce
- Kopczyn
- Krzyżanna
- Krzyżownica
- Kunowo
- Kwieciszewo
- Leśnik
- Łosośniki
- Lubieszewo
- Marcinkowo
- Mielenko
- Mielno
- Niestronno
- Olsza
- Padniewko
- Padniewo
- Palędzie Dolne
- Palędzie Kościelne
- Płaczkówko
- Procyń
- Przyjma
- Ratowo
- Sadowiec
- Skrzeszewo
- Stawiska
- Strzelce
- Świerkówiec
- Szczeglin
- Szerzawy
- Szydłówko
- Targownica
- Twierdziń
- Wasielewko
- Wiecanowo
- Wieniec
- Wszedzień
- Wylatowo
- Wymysłowo Szlacheckie
- Wyrobki
- Żabienko
- Żabno
- Zbytowo

== Neighbouring gminas ==
Gmina Mogilno is bordered by the gminas of Dąbrowa, Gąsawa, Janikowo, Orchowo, Rogowo, Strzelno and Trzemeszno.
