= Gmina Dąbrowa, Kuyavian-Pomeranian Voivodeship =

Gmina Dąbrowa Dąbrowa Commune
- Gmina
- Flag Coat of arms
- Interactive map of Gmina Dąbrowa
- Coordinates (Dąbrowa): 52°44′N 17°56′E
- Country: Poland
- Voivodeship: Kuyavian-Pomeranian
- County: Mogilno
- Seat: Dąbrowa

Area
  - Total: 110.51 km^{2} (42.67 sq mi)

Population (2006)
  - Total: 4,711
  - Density: 42.63/km^{2} (110.4/sq mi)
- Website: http://ug-dabrowa.pl/

Gmina Dąbrowa is a rural gmina (administrative district) in Mogilno County, Kuyavian-Pomeranian Voivodeship, in north-central Poland. Its seat is the village of Dąbrowa, which lies approximately 10 kilometres (6 mi) north of Mogilno and 43 km (27 mi) south of Bydgoszcz.

The gmina covers an area of 110.51 square kilometres (42.7 sq mi), and as of 2006 its total population is 4,711.

== Villages ==
Gmina Dąbrowa contains the villages and settlements of Białe Błota, Dąbrowa, Krzekotowo, Mierucin, Mierucinek, Mokre, Parlin, Parlinek, Sędowo, Słaboszewko, Słaboszewo, Sucharzewo, Szczepankowo and Szczepanowo.

== Neighbouring gminas ==
Gmina Dąbrowa is bordered by the gminas of Barcin, Gąsawa, Janikowo, Mogilno, Pakość and Żnin.
