= Silesian Uprising Cross =

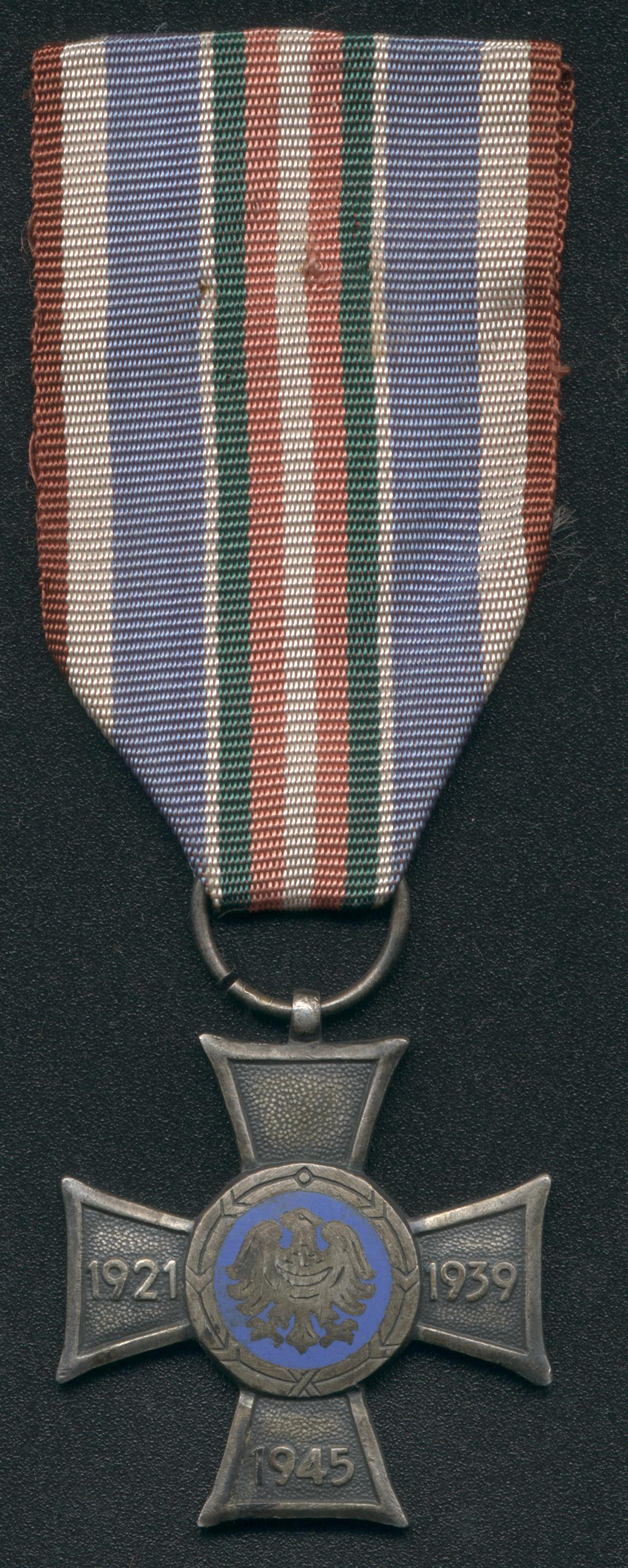
Silesian Uprising Cross

Silesian Uprising Cross (Polish: Śląski Krzyż Powstańczy) is a Polish military decoration, established in 1946, awarded to veterans of the Silesian Uprisings (1919-1921) and to members of Polish resistance in World War II active in Silesia. The order ceased to be given out in 1999.
