= Mogilno County =

Mogilno County Powiat mogileński
- County
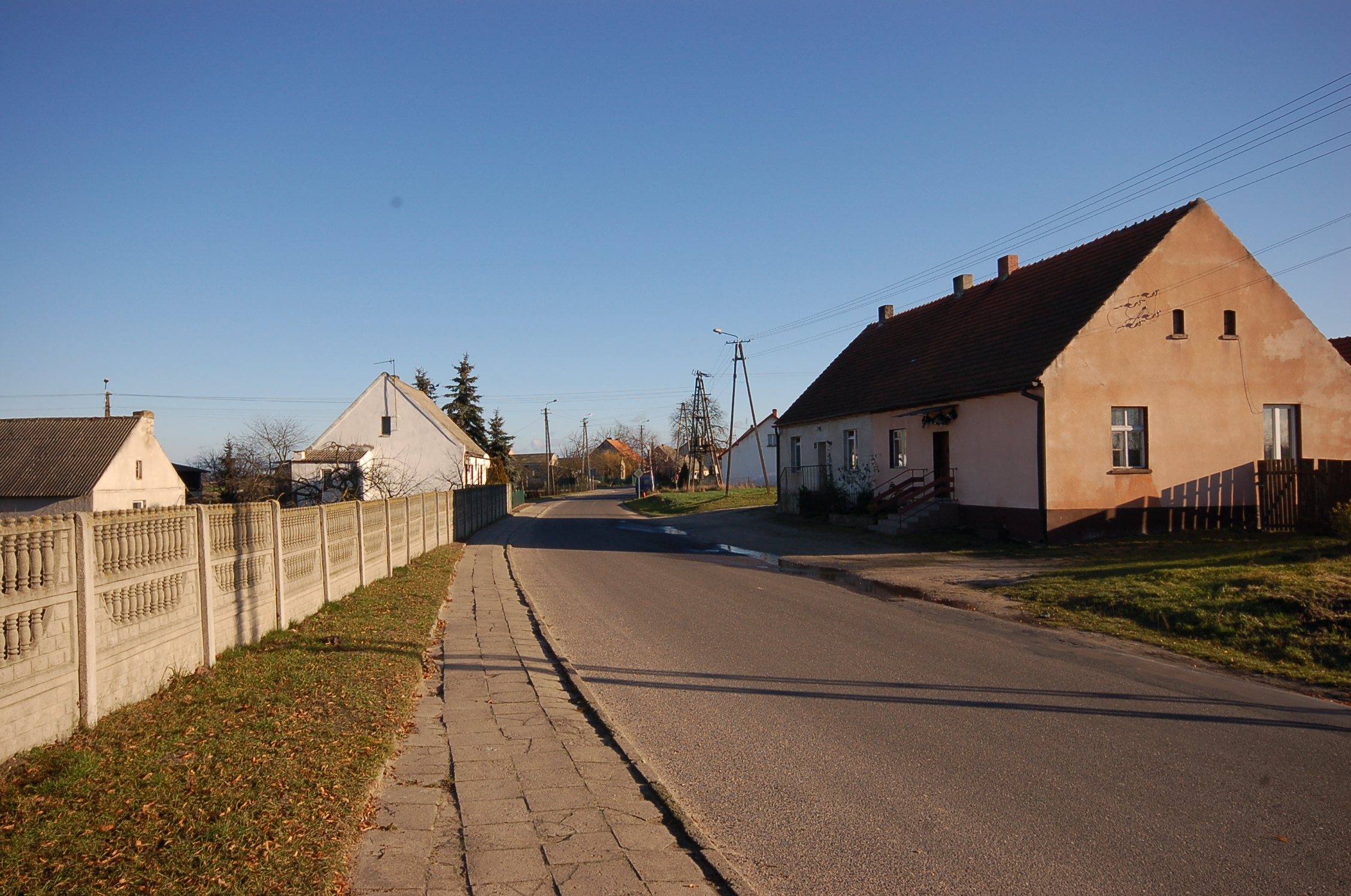

- Flag Coat of arms

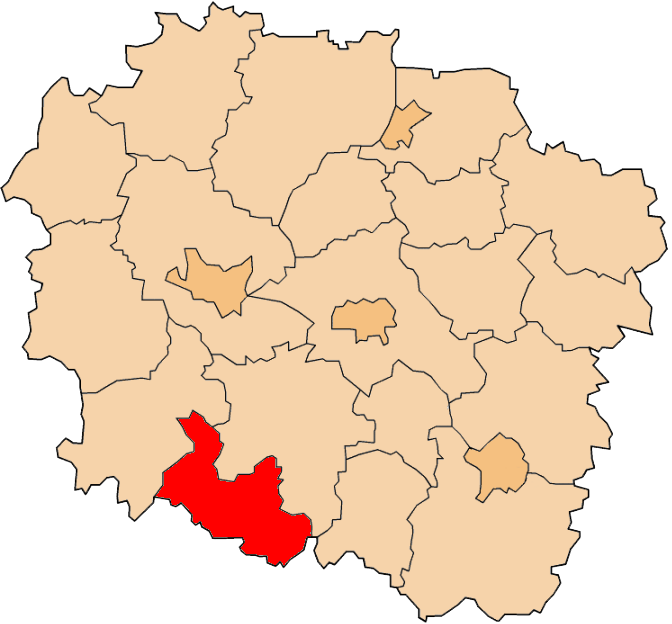
- Location within the voivodeship
- Coordinates (Mogilno): 52°39′N 17°57′E
- Country: Poland
- Voivodeship: Kuyavian-Pomeranian
- Seat: Mogilno
- Gminas: Total 4: Gmina Dąbrowa; Gmina Jeziora Wielkie; Gmina Mogilno; Gmina Strzelno

Area
  - Total: 675.86 km^{2} (260.95 sq mi)

Population (2006)
  - Total: 45,756
  - Density: 67.700/km^{2} (175.34/sq mi)
  - Urban: 17,467
  - Rural: 28,289
- Car plates: CMG
- Website: www.powiat.mogilno.pl

Mogilno County (Polish: powiat mogileński) is a unit of territorial administration and local government (powiat) in Kuyavian-Pomeranian Voivodeship, north-central Poland. It was formed on January 1, 1999, as a result of the Polish local government reforms passed in 1998. Its administrative seat and largest town is Mogilno, which lies 52 km (32 mi) south of Bydgoszcz and 62 km (39 mi) south-west of Toruń. The only other town in the county is Strzelno, lying 16 km (10 mi) east of Mogilno.

The county covers an area of 675.86 square kilometres (261.0 sq mi). As of 2006 its total population is 45,756, out of which the population of Mogilno is 11,836, that of Strzelno is 5,631, and the rural population is 28,289.

== Neighbouring counties ==
Mogilno County is bordered by Inowrocław County to the north-east, Konin County and Słupca County to the south, Gniezno County to the west, and Żnin County to the north-west.

== Administrative divisions ==
The county is subdivided into four gminas (two urban-rural and two rural). These are listed in the following table, in descending order of population.

Gmina	Type	Area (km^{2})	Population (2019)	Seat
Gmina Mogilno	urban-rural	256.1	24,632	Mogilno
Gmina Strzelno	urban-rural	185.3	11,605	Strzelno
Gmina Jeziora Wielkie	rural	124.0	4,897	Jeziora Wielkie
Gmina Dąbrowa	rural	110.5	4,622	Dąbrowa
