= Chaim Heller =

Talmudist scholar (1879–1960)

Rabbi Chaim Heller (Hebrew: חיים הלר; 10 July 1879 – 10 April 1960) was a prominent Talmudist and Targumic scholar who combined traditional rabbinic erudition with expertise in modern textual research. He was renowned for his command of ancient languages. He was awarded the Rabbi Kook Prize for Rabbinical literature in 1947.

== Biography ==
Born in 1879 in Białystok to Israel Pinsker, he was the younger brother of Nachman Heller, who would also become an American rabbi. Israel was himself a well-known Talmudic prodigy and, according to his gravestone, he finished the Talmud Bavli 70 times. He was the grandson of Chaim Broda, author of the Zera Chaim (published by Heller). After the death of Chaim's mother, he was raised in Warsaw by his uncle Yaakov Yosef Broda, where he was famous for his Talmudic acumen from an early age, earning him the title "Illui of Warsaw". From the age of ten he self-educated, and he never attended a yeshiva. Around 1899, he married the daughter of H. Diskin, a wealthy Jew from Łódź. In the house of his rich uncle in Warsaw, he met and disputed with the greatest Talmudists of the age, including Yosef Dov Soloveitchik, Chaim Soloveitchik, Joseph B. Soloveitchik (who became his disciple), Yisrael Meir Kagan, Eugen Mittwoch, Yechiel Yaakov Weinberg, Yitzchak Elchanan Spektor, Naftali Zvi Yehuda Berlin, and his son Chaim Berlin (Note: Chaim Berlin refers in a responsum to "the memory of our friendship, when we took sweet counsel together in many deep halakhic matters in the house of [Heller's] uncle." (SHUT Nishmat Chaim #72)). Outside of Warsaw, he worked halakhic matters with Chaim Hezekiah Medini, Baruch Lavski, Meir Dan Plotzky, Eliyahu David Rabinowitz-Teomim, Eliezer Gordon, Eliyahu Klatzkin, Yosef Engel, and others. He was a close friend of Chaim Ozer Grodzinski, Eliyahu Chaim Meisel, and Eliyahu Feinstein.

In 1906, Heller spent a short while learning at the University of St. Petersburg, before moving to Berlin the following year. Heller received a doctorate from the University of Würzburg in 1910. After the death of Malkiel Tzvi Tenenbaum, the community of Łomża chose Heller to replace him. By this time Heller had already begun to publish well-received researches on the Septuagint and on Maimonides. Despite this, he soon left the rabbinate. Soloveitchik recalled that Heller told him that he was concerned that his position as community rabbi would require him to deal with soul-crushing concerns.

In November 1920, Heller came to New York to continue working on his edition of the Peshitta. Heller then went to Berlin, where he founded the Academy of Higher Jewish Learning in 1922 and led seminars which academically investigated Judaic literature. The school did not succeed, failing to find enough students which met its standards. Soloveitchik attended the classes, as did Abraham Aharon Price and Menachem Mendel Schneerson, Heller's friend. In 1937, as the Nazis rose to power, Heller left for New York, where he continued his academic work while teaching at Rabbi Isaac Elchanan Theological Seminary. Heller was renowned for his ability to bring age-old stories to life. Soloveitchik had such respect for Heller that he would pause public lectures when he saw Heller arrive to help him with his coat and escort him to his seat. By the end of his life, Heller's voice had grown so weak that he could not lecture to groups even with the aid of a microphone. Instead, Soloveitchik would sit next to him and repeat his lectures verbatim to the crowd.

He was an honorary president of the Orthodox Union and the co-chair of the Rabbinical Council of America's Halakha Commission.

Heller died in 1960, leaving behind a wife, Frieda Heller (née Diskin), and three daughters, including Miriam Heller and Rebecca Singer.

He is buried in Mount Judah cemetery in Ridgewood, Queens. His funeral was attended by hundreds of rabbis, led by Joseph B. Soloveitchik.

Roads in Rehovot and Givat Mordechai are named after him.

== Academic work ==
Heller dealt with many diverse areas of Hebrew Bible, Talmud, and Halakha. In his research he sought to clarify texts with correct manuscript readings. In general his approach was conservative, but he did not shun modern investigations of Jewish and non-Jewish works. He saw his investigations of the ancient Biblical versions as a holy mission to prove the integrity of the Masoretic Text. He wrote fifteen books, mostly in Hebrew.

His works include an edition of Sefer HaMitzvot, a two-volume work on Shulchan Aruch, Choshen Mishpat entitled LeChikrei Halachot, Nusach HaShomroni (also published in English as The Samaritan Pentateuch), and other works. Posthumously published works include a few letters and a photoscan of Heller's personal Biblia Hebraica, including his cross-references, published by Heller's son-in-law Joseph Singer in four volumes as Sefer Mesoret haTaNaKH (1996). Heller, who also lost complete manuscripts in The Holocaust, reportedly left behind a substantial pile of unpublished material, but no manuscripts are known to be now extant.
