= Avraham Aharon Price =

Canadian rabbi (1900–1994)

Abraham Aharon Price (December 10, 1900 – March 30, 1994) was a renowned Torah scholar, writer, educator, and a community leader in Toronto, Ontario, Canada. He was one of the city's most influential rabbinic figures.

== Early life ==
Abraham Aharon Price was born on December 10, 1900, in Stopnica, a town in Busko County, Świętokrzyskie Voivodeship, in south-central Poland, to Rabbi Joseph and Basia Price. At the age of 7, he studied with Rabbi Jerusalimski in Kielce. At the age of 9, he was sent to study with Rabbi Avrohom Bornsztain, founder of the Sochatchov Hasidic dynasty and author of Avnei Nezer. He was ordained by Rabbi Sillman at the Rabbinical Seminary in Sochaczew, Poland in 1919. In 1923, Price moved to Berlin, where he became a banker. In Berlin, he studied with Rabbi Chaim Heller after business hours. In connection with rise of Nazism, he fled Berlin for Paris in the early 1930s, and lived there before arriving in Toronto, Canada, in 1937.

== Career ==
In Toronto, Price was named dean of the Torat Chaim yeshiva and was rabbi of several congregations. In 1941 he ordained the first three rabbis to be ordained in Canada. Initially, Yeshiva Torat Chaim was based in a crowded room on College Street. Then, it moved to a house at Ulster and Markham Street, Toronto, and seven years later, to his yeshiva building at the corner of Montrose Avenue and College Street. Sometime in the 1960s, Yeshiva Torah Chaim was located at 475 Lawrence Avenue West in Toronto, and was also a strictly orthodox synagogue.

== Notable students ==
Many prominent rabbis were ordained at Price's yeshiva and many students received their Hebrew and Talmudic educations there. A number of Price's students became influential community leaders in their own right.

- Michael Rosensweig – Rosh Yeshiva at the Rabbi Isaac Elchanan Theological Seminary of Yeshiva University and the Rosh Kollel of the Beren Kollel Elyon
- Gedaliah Felder, in addition to succeeding Price as Chief Rabbi of Toronto, also led the Shomrai Shabos Synagogue of Toronto
- Albert Pappenheim led Beth David B'nai Israel Beth Am Congregation of Toronto
- Erwin Schild led Adath Israel Congregation (Toronto) of Toronto
- Benjamin Hauer led Congregation Chevra Kadisha – B'nai Jacob of Montreal
- Phillip Rosensweig led the Beth Jacob Congregation of Kitchener-Waterloo; and Joseph Kelman led Beth Emeth Bais Yehuda Synagogue of Toronto. .

== World War II refugees ==
Despite Canada’s restrictive immigration policy towards Jewish refugees during the Holocaust, Price worked to have young Jewish refugees released from internment camps to come study in his yeshiva. In 1942, Price worked with the Canadian Jewish Congress and Senator Arthur Roebuck to negotiate the release of 50 men from an internment camp in Quebec. In 1948, he sponsored 55 young Czechoslovak refugees. Many of these individuals went on to study under his tutelage in his yeshiva where he ensured they were housed, clothed, and provided with mentorship.

== Library ==
Rabbi Price was known for his impressive collection of rabbinic materials. By 1950 The Toronto Daily Star reported on his library:

As Rabbi A. A. Price works in his study on Palmerston Blvd., he is surrounded by what is probably the largest private library of Hebrew books on this continent, a total of 2,200 volumes. Among them is one published in Italy 416 years ago and written by Benjamin Zev, a physician and scholar. There is only on other copy of Zev's book know to exist and it is in the British Museum.... Rabbi Price's present library represents less than half of the original collection owned by the Polish-born, 51-year-old rabbi. He had them brought over after he decided to extend a visit to Toronto in 1935 into a permanent stay. The rest of his books were destroyed in Paris by the Germans a week before the French capital was liberated. His brother and sister were killed in France by the Nazis, and recently an orphaned niece arrived in Toronto.

After his death, more than 3,000 items from his collection of rabbinical works, some of them very old, were donated to the University of Toronto Library. Many of his older books are now held at the Thomas Fisher Rare Book Library at the University of Toronto in the Price Collection of Rabbinics.

== Writings ==
Price authored at least four sets of books. Mishnat Avraham (Vol. 1 and 2 published in 1944) and Imrei Avraham (Vol. 1 published in 1946, Vol. 2 published in 1975) both contain his speeches and writings on the weekly torah portion and the Jewish holidays. The other two sets contain his commentary on two important 13th Century Jewish texts. The three-volume Sefer Hasidim is a commentary on the 12th-13th Century work of the same name by Judah ben Samuel of Regensburg. The four-volume Mitzvot Gadol is a commentary on one of the earliest codifications of Halakah by Judah's student, Moses ben Jacob of Coucy, known as "SeMaG", short for Sefer Mitzvot Gadol.

== Honours ==
In 1965 Price was awarded the Rabbi Abraham Isaac Kook award of merit signed by the mayor of Tel Aviv on the recommendation of the Chief Rabbis of Israel, Isser Yehuda Unterman and Yitzhak Nissim. Price donated his prize money to aid impoverished rabbis in Israel.

== Foundation ==
The Rabbi Price Foundation is involved in the advancement of Jewish education and also in the completion and publication of Price's in-progress manuscripts.
