= Sefer Mitzvot Gadol =

- Author: Moses ben Jacob of Coucy
- Original title: ספר מצוות גדול
- Language: Hebrew
- Subject: Halakha
- Publication place: France

Sefer Mitzvot Gadol (Hebrew: ספר מצוות גדול; in English: "The Great Book of Commandments"; abbreviated: סמ״ג, "SeMaG") work of halakha by Moses ben Jacob of Coucy, containing an enumeration of the 613 commandments.

== Description ==
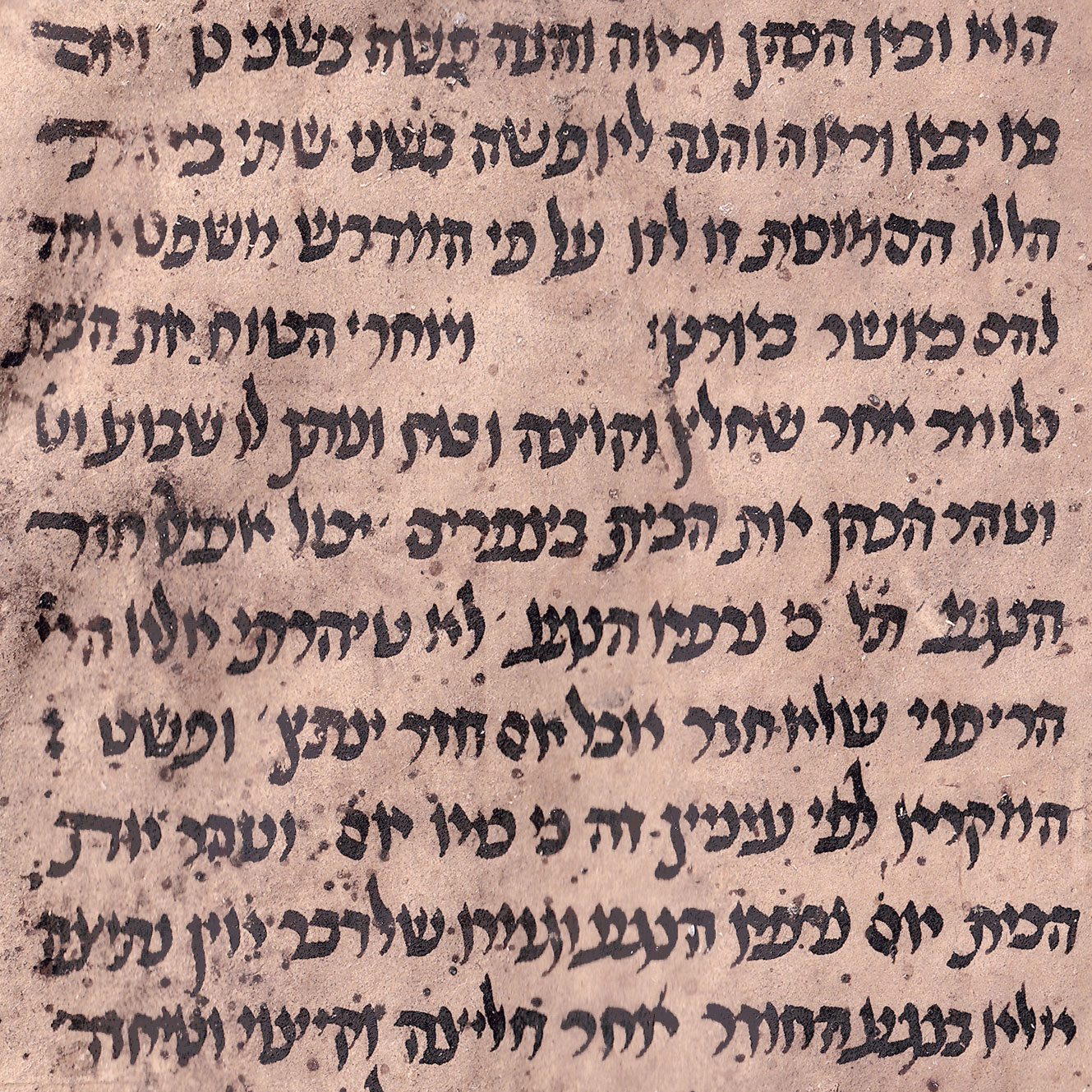
Manuscript fragment of Sefer Mitzvot Gadol, 13th century

The work was completed in 1247, and is a literary work that deals with the 365 negative commandments (mitzvot), and the 248 positive commandments, discussing each one of them separately, according to the Talmud and the decisions made by the rabbis. "SeMaG" also contains many non-legalistic moral teachings. The references in the "SeMaG" are ordered by section (negative and positive commandments alike) and there is a number for each commandment in every section of the book.

The arrangements and the presentation are strongly influenced by the discussions of Maimonides about the commandments, which are found in Sefer HaMitzvot and Mishneh Torah, and the citations of Maimonides were influential in making Maimonides' works know in the Ashkenazic world. Unlike Maimonides, Rabbi Moses ben Jacob presents long discussions of the different interpretations and legal opinions. The work also makes extensive use of other legal codes, especially the comments of Rashi and the Tosafists, normally favoring the Ashkenazi traditions over the opinion of Maimonides.

The traditional commentaries on the "SeMaG" include the "Tosefe SeMaG" by Rabbi Elijah Mizrachi (the Re'em), and "Ammude Shlomo" by Rabbi Solomon Luria (the Maharshal). Mitzvot Gadol is a modern commentary by Rabbi Avraham Aharon Price. The Sefer Mitzvot Katan ("SeMaK") by Rabbi Isaac ben Joseph of Corbeil, is a summary of the "SeMaG", including additional material about ethics and legends (aggadah).

The oldest known, complete manuscript from 1288 is now in Switzerland, in the largest private collection of Hebrew manuscripts, the Braginsky Collection. A document at about the same time can be found in the Bibliothèque nationale de France (ms. Hébr. 370).
