= Benedictine Monastery, Mogilno =

Benedictine monastery in Mogilno, Poland

Benedictine Monastery in Mogilno
- Klasztor Benedyktynów w Mogilnie
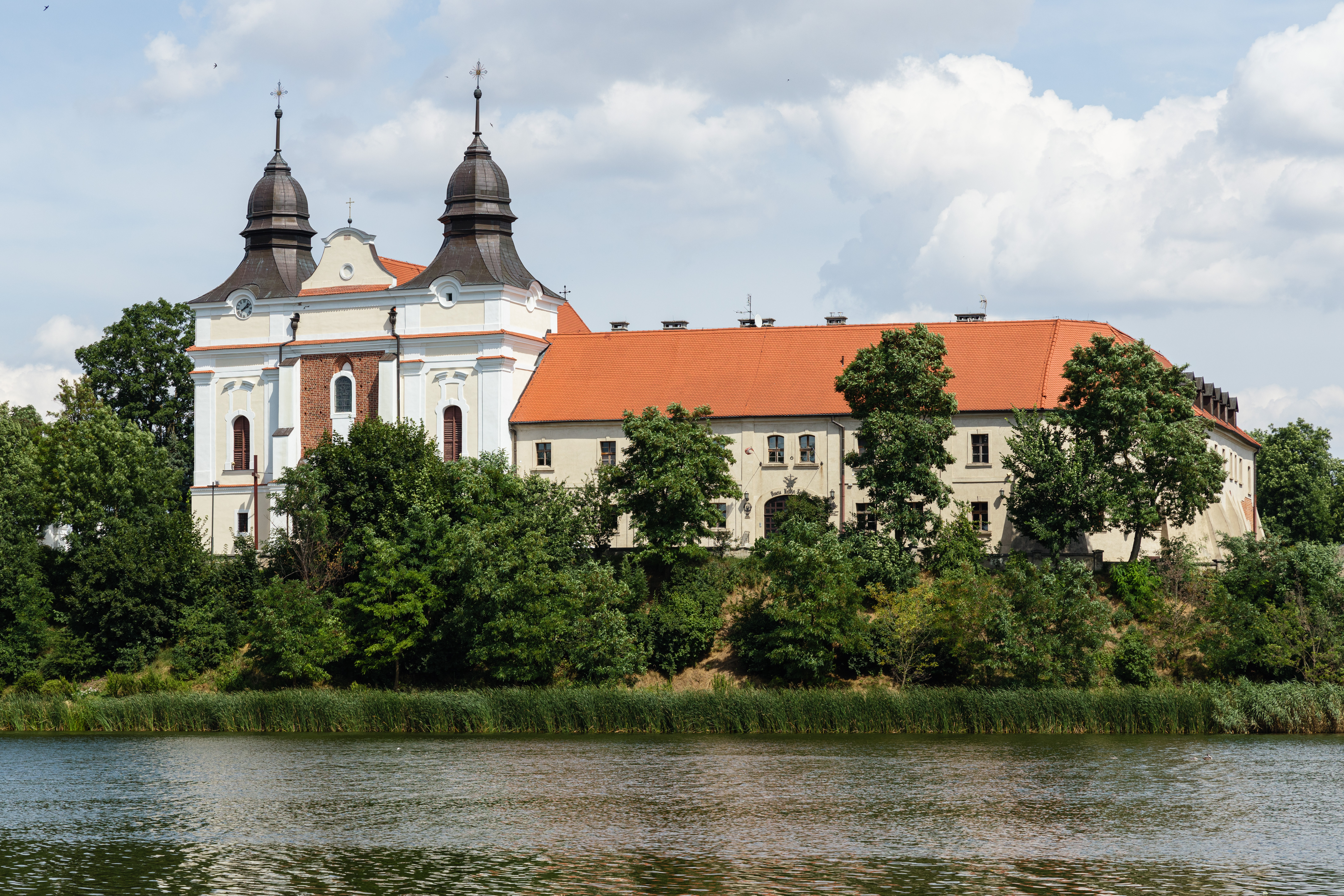
- (Credit: Łukasz Bakuła)

- Location within Poland
- Interactive map of Benedictine Monastery in Mogilno

Monastery information
- Order: Order of Saint Benedict
- Established: 1050

People
- Founder: Casimir the Restorer

Architecture
- Heritage designation: Register of monuments

Site
- Location: Mogilno
- Country: Poland
- Coordinates: 52°38′53.7″N 17°57′18.5″E

The Benedictine Monastery in Mogilno is an 11th century Benedictine monastery in Mogilno, Poland. It is the second oldest Benedictine monastery in Poland, after the monastery in Tyniec. It is on the register of monuments in Poland.

The complex features the parish church of St. John.

== History ==
The monastery was founded around 1050 by Casimir the Restorer who intended the Mogilno and Tyniec monasteries to support the rebuilding of Polish religious society after several years of chaos. Early financial support for the monastery came from a variety of sources, including tithes from fairs and donations from members of the Piast dynasty. By the 12th century, after a frenzy of monastery foundations, the Benedictines began to lose prominence in Poland.

In the 16th and 17th centuries, the monastery buildings and church received their last notable renovations. The monastery was then closed in the 19th century.

During World War II, the Nazis used the monastery as a jail and depot for prisoners.

== Architecture ==
The complex features Baroque and Romanesque elements, a quadrangle, and vaulted crypts.

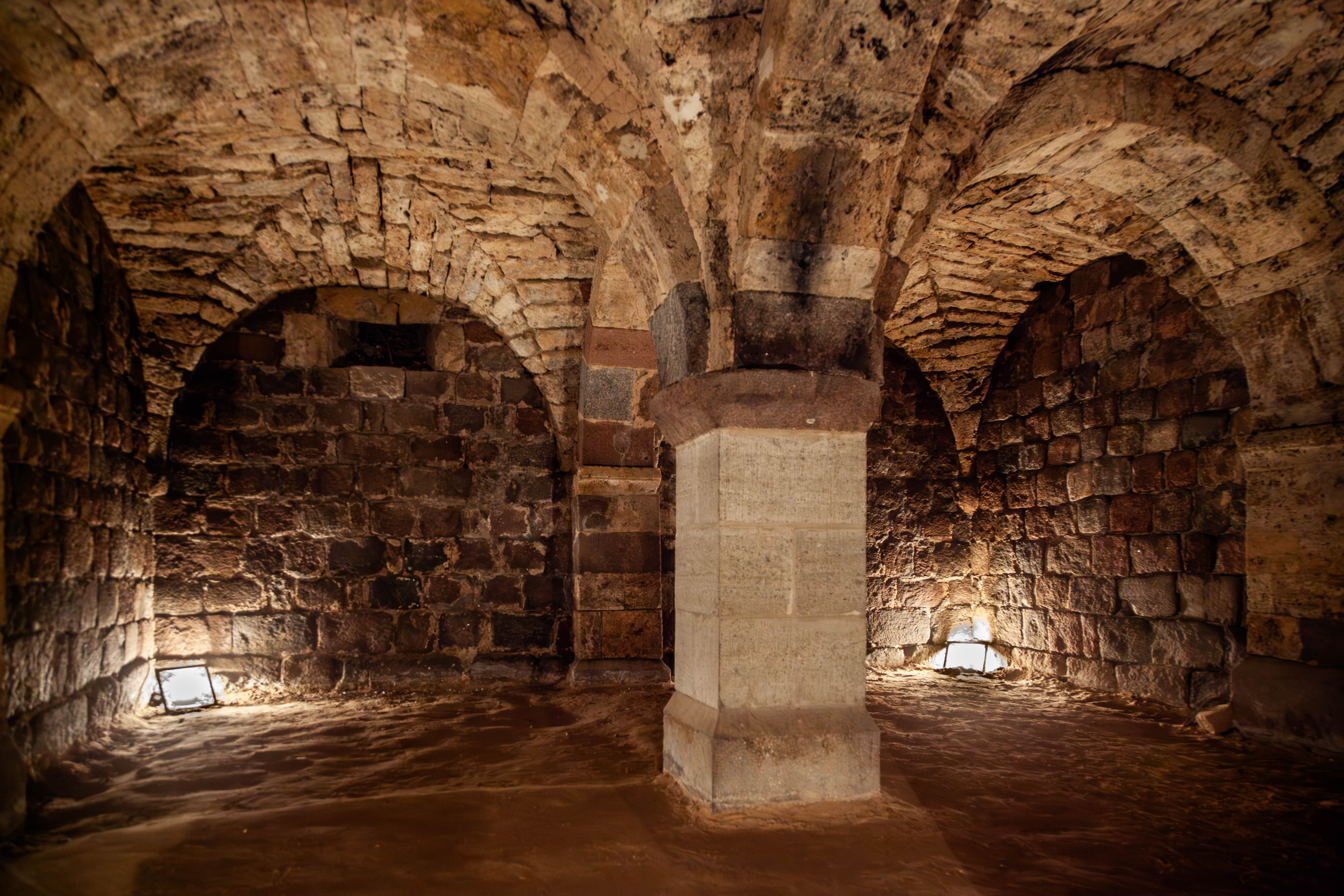
Crypt

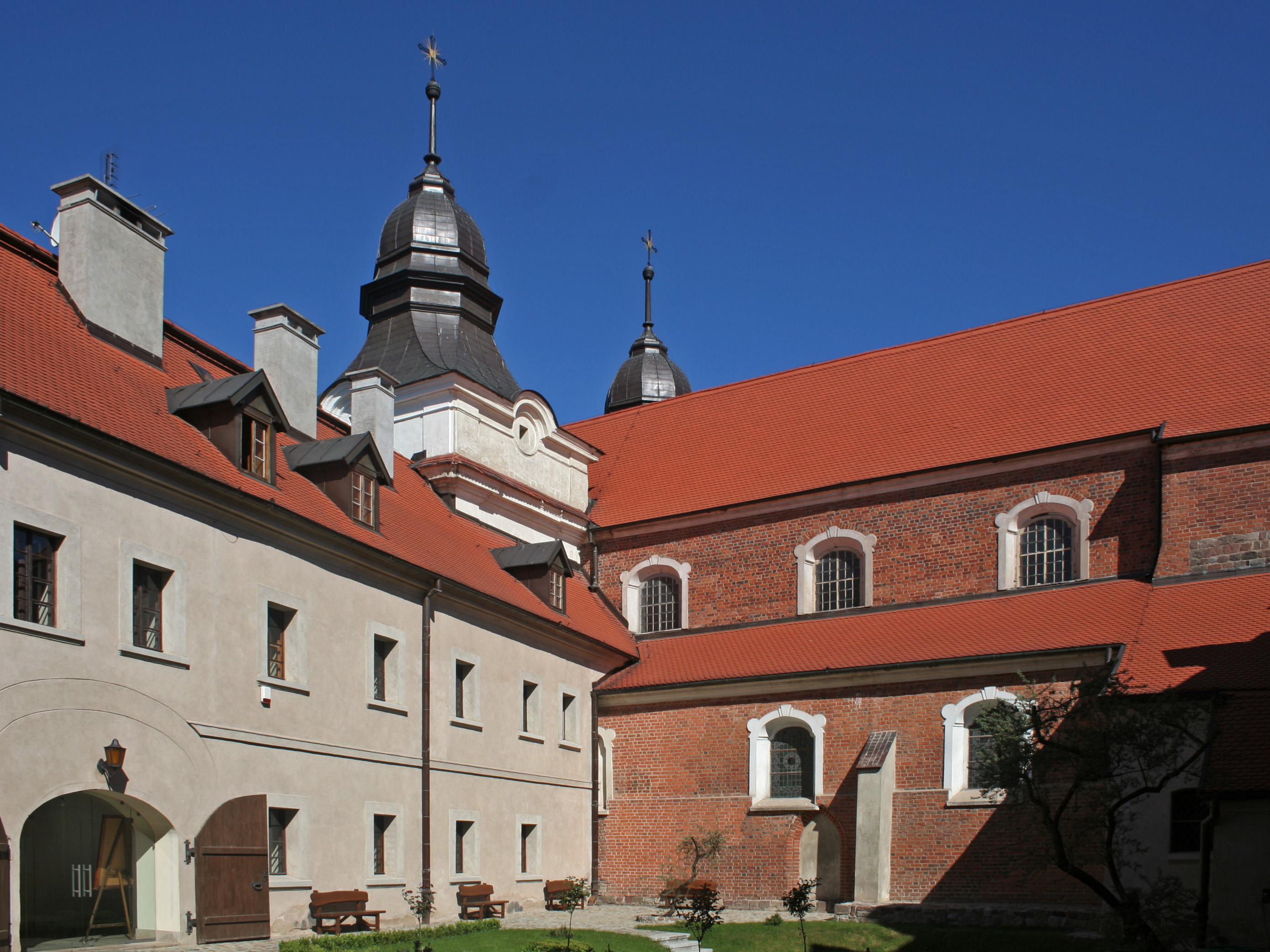
Interior quadrangle

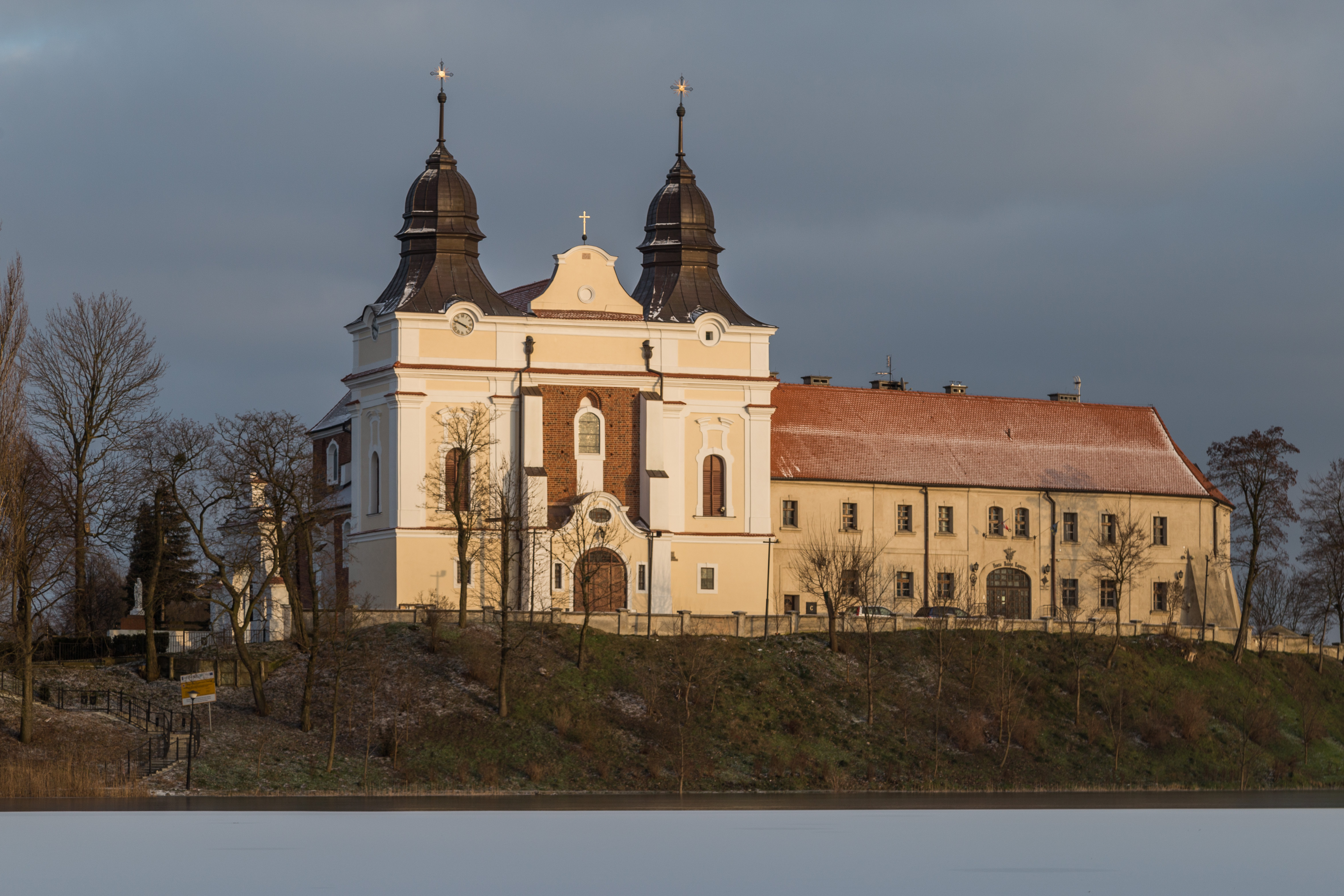
Baroque facade

== See also ==
- Christianization of Poland
- Mogilno Falsification
