= Leeser =

Leeser is a Yiddish surname derived from the Hebrew name Eliezer. People with the name include:

- Isaac Leeser (1806–1868), American Jewish leader
- Julian Leeser (born 1976), Australian politician
- Oscar Leeser (born 1958), American politician, Mayor of El Paso
- Rolf Leeser (1929–2018), German-born footballer and fashion designer
- Thomas Leeser (born 1952), American architect
- Maurice Leeser (born 1969), Dutch Sport Director

== See also ==
- Leeser Architecture
- Leeser Rosenthal (1794–1868), book collector
