= Bianca Stigter =

Dutch film director

- Born: May 19, 1964 (age 62); Amsterdam, Netherlands
- Occupations: Writer, director, producer
- Partner: Steve McQueen

Bianca Stigter, Lady McQueen is a Dutch film director from Amsterdam. She directed Three Minutes: A Lengthening.

She is married to director Steve McQueen, and was associate producer on his films Widows and 12 Years a Slave.

== Films ==
Stigter's film Three Minutes: A Lengthening, dissects a short home movie filmed in Nasielsk, Poland, in 1938. The footage is significant because 3,000 of Nasielsk's 7,000 inhabitants were Jewish and only 100 of those residents survived the Holocaust. Stigter's editing of the footage acts to lengthen its screentime from 3 minutes to 69 minutes, while posing questions about the characters and their fate. The film is narrated by Helena Bonham Carter. The film was co-written by Glenn Kurtz, who describes "This is probably the only movie imagery of this community before it was destroyed, and almost certainly the only images of many of the people, particularly the children who appear in it, in existence. I felt this tremendous sense of responsibility to their memory."

Stigter is the writer for the 2023 documentary Occupied City, which focuses on the Nazi occupation of Amsterdam from 1940 to 1945. The film is based on her illustrated history book, Atlas of an Occupied City, Amsterdam 1940-1945.

== Awards and honours ==
In October 2024, Stigter was awarded an honorary doctorate from the University of Amsterdam together with her husband Steve McQueen for bringing "major social issues and political and historical themes to the attention of a large audience".
