= Diskin =

Diskin may refer to:

- Diskin Orphanage, also known as "Diskin Orphan Home" - founded by Rabbi Yehoshua Leib Diskin
- Diskin (surname)
- Diskin (album), by The Drum
