= Glenn Kurtz =

American musician

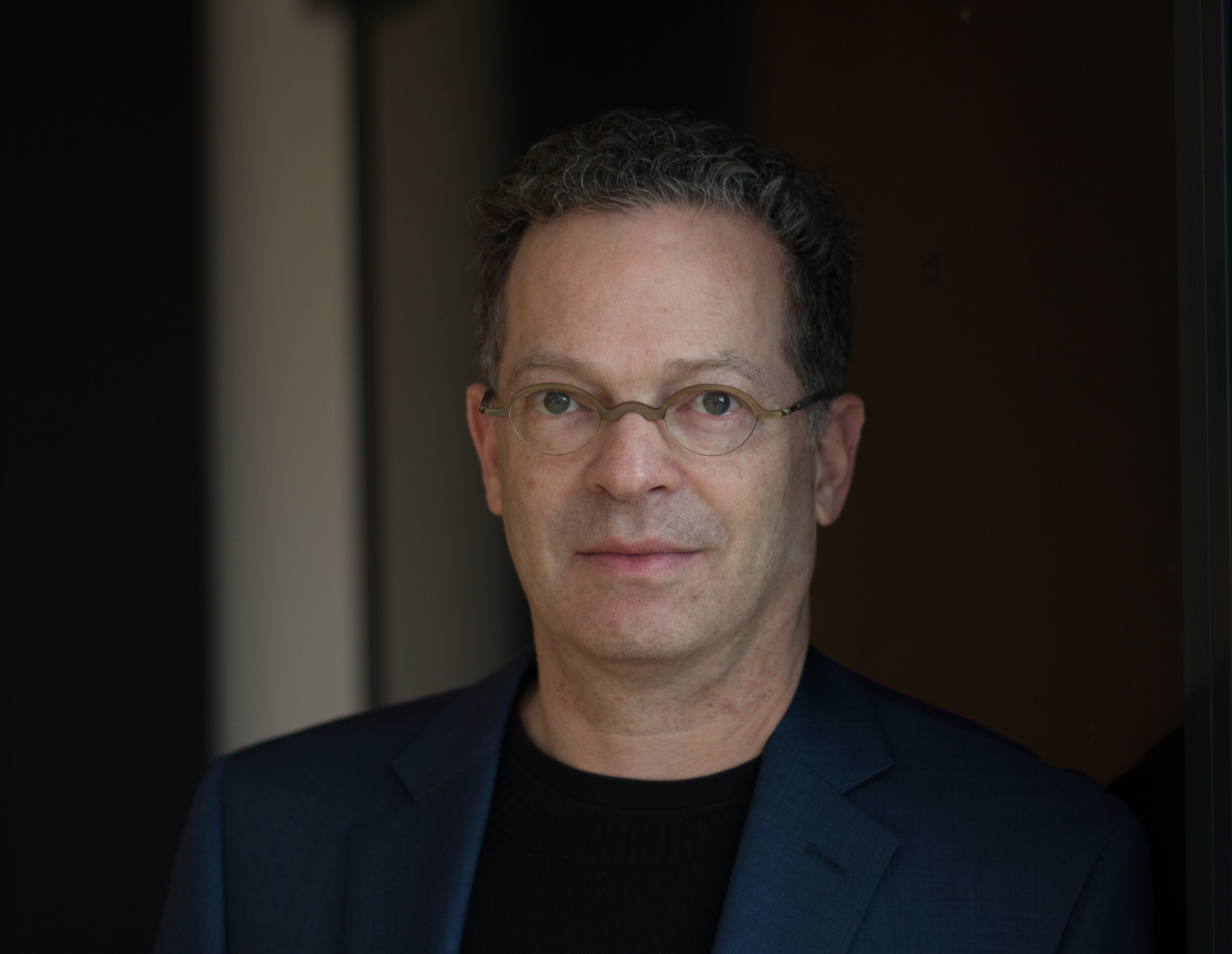
- Born: Roslyn, New York
- Occupation: Writer
- Writing career
- Genres: Memoir, creative nonfiction
- Subjects: Classical music, the guitar
- Notable work: Practicing: A Musician's Return to Music (2007)
- Glenn Kurtz's voice recorded January 2015
- Website: glennkurtz.com

Glenn Kurtz is an American writer and the author of Practicing: A Musician's Return to Music (Knopf, 2007; Vintage paperback, 2008).

== Biography ==
Kurtz is a graduate of the New England Conservatory-Tufts University double degree program. He has a PhD from Stanford University in German Studies and Comparative Literature. His writing has been published in ZYZZYVA, Artweek, Tema Celeste, and elsewhere, and he has taught at Stanford University, San Francisco State University, and California College of the Arts.

=== Practicing ===
Practicing has been reviewed in the San Francisco Chronicle, the New York Times, and in other publications, and on NPR.

=== Three Minutes in Poland ===
In 2009, Kurtz found a home video shot by his family that included three minutes of footage in Nasielsk, Poland, shot in 1938. He set out to restore the film and find the people in it. The book based on this journey is titled Three Minutes in Poland: Discovering a Lost World in a 1938 Family Film (Farrar, Straus and Giroux, 2014). The film Three Minutes: A Lengthening (2022), directed by Bianca Stigter, is based on the book.
