= Braginsky Collection =

The collection of the Swiss collector René Braginsky is generally considered to be the largest private collection of Hebrew manuscripts in the world. It also contains a fair number of fine early printed books. The collection does not only contain codices, but also several hundreds illuminated marriage contracts and Esther scrolls.

The oldest manuscript in the collection is the 1288 legal code of rabbinic scholar Moses of Coucy.

The collection has been exhibited at the Jewish Museum of Switzerland (2003-2004), at the Bibliotheca Rosenthaliana, the Judaica and Hebraica Special Collections Division of the University of Amsterdam, (2009–2010), at the Yeshiva University Museum in New York (2010), the Israel Museum in Jerusalem (2010–2011), at the Swiss National Museum in Zurich (2011–2012) and at the Jewish Museum in Berlin (2014).

== Books ==
- A Journey through Jewish Worlds: Highlights from the Braginsky Collection of Hebrew Manuscripts and Printed Books, Evelyn M. Cohen, Emile Schrijver, Sharon Mintz, Waanders Publishers, 2010.
- Schöne Seiten: Jüdische Schriftkultur aus der Braginsky Collection, Emile Schrijver, Falk Wiesemann, Scheidegger & Spiess, 2011.
