= Voodoo tata =

- Film poster
- Voodoo Dad
- Directed by: Piotr Matwiejczyk
- Written by: Piotr Matwiejczyk
- Screenplay by: Piotr Matwiejczyk; Justyna Matwiejczyk
- Produced by: Piotr Matwiejczyk; Michał Kępiński
- Starring: Piotr Matwiejczyk; Andrzej Gałła; Grzegorz Halama
- Cinematography: Michał Kępiński
- Edited by: Michał Kępiński
- Music by: Jakub Sienkiewicz
- Production companies: Muflon Pictures; Studio Filmowe Jaskółka
- Distributed by: Ale Kino+
- Release date: 12 August 2018
- Running time: 82 minutes
- Country: Poland
- Language: Polish

Voodoo tata (English: Voodoo Dad) is a 2018 independent Polish comedy film directed and written by Piotr Matwiejczyk.

The plot revolves around the protagonist, a 35-year-old man, freeloading off his father. The father is fed up with the lazy son and makes desperate attempts to influence him. He sends him to a job centre, gives him orders and sanctions, tries to shape his life but is not met with any positive reaction. The son, at the recommendation of a friend, creates a voodoo doll of his father as he wants to show him what it is like when someone controls another person.

The film was entirely shot and set in Mogilno.
