= Erwin Schild =

Canadian Conservative rabbi (1920–2024)

Erwin Schild CM
- Title: Rabbi, Senior Rabbi

Personal life
- Born: March 9, 1920 Cologne, Rhine Province, Prussia, Germany
- Died: January 6, 2024 (aged 103) Toronto, Ontario, Canada

Religious life
- Religion: Judaism
- Denomination: Conservative
- Synagogue: Adath Israel Congregation
- Position: Rabbi
- Began: 1947
- Ended: 1989

Erwin Schild CM (March 9, 1920 – January 6, 2024) was a German-born Canadian Conservative rabbi and author.

== Biography ==
Born in Cologne, Germany, a Holocaust survivor of the Dachau concentration camp, he was the author of World Through My Window and his autobiography The very narrow bridge: a memoir of an uncertain passage. In September 1947, he became the Rabbi of Adath Israel Congregation in Toronto, Ontario and was appointed Rabbi Emeritus upon his retirement in 1989.

In 2001, he was made a Member of the Order of Canada, Canada's highest civilian honour, for "improving dialogue between the Christian and Jewish faiths, promoting harmony at home and abroad". In 2000, he was awarded the Officer's Cross (Offizierkreuz) of the Order of Merit of the Federal Republic of Germany.

Schild died on January 6, 2024, at the age of 103 in Toronto.
