= Occupied City =

2023 film by Steve McQueen

- Theatrical release poster
- Directed by: Steve McQueen
- Written by: Bianca Stigter (Note: Credited with "Texts written by".)
- Based on: Atlas van een bezette stad, Amsterdam 1940–1945 by Bianca Stigter
- Produced by: Steve McQueen; Bianca Stigter; Anna Smith-Tenser; Floor Onrust
- Narrated by: Melanie Hyams (EN); Carice van Houten (NL)
- Cinematography: Lennert Hillege
- Edited by: Xander Nijsten
- Music by: Oliver Coates
- Production companies: Regency Enterprises; A24; Film4; Family Affair Films; Lammas Park; VPRO
- Distributed by: A24 (United States); September Film (Netherlands); Modern Films (United Kingdom)
- Release dates: 17 May 2023 (Cannes); 30 November 2023 (Netherlands); 25 December 2023 (United States); 9 February 2024 (United Kingdom)
- Running time: 266 minutes; 2040 minutes (installation)
- Countries: United Kingdom; Netherlands; United States
- Language: English
- Box office: $152,934

Occupied City is a 2023 documentary film directed and produced by Steve McQueen, and based on the book Atlas of an Occupied City, Amsterdam 1940–1945 by Bianca Stigter. The film features narration by Melanie Hyams, describing the occupation of the Netherlands by Nazi Germany, juxtaposed against footage of modern-day Amsterdam echoing much of the narration. The film is a co-production between the United Kingdom, the Netherlands, and the United States.

Occupied City had its world premiere at the 2023 Cannes Film Festival on 17 May 2023 as a special screening, where it competed for the L'Œil d'or. It was released in the United States on 25 December 2023, and in the United Kingdom and Ireland on 9 February 2024.

== Production ==
In January 2022, it was confirmed that Steve McQueen would direct and produce the film about Amsterdam under Nazi occupation during World War II, with A24 and New Regency handling the domestic and international and both co-financing. Film4 also provided co-financing and retains United Kingdom linear television rights.

McQueen said that there is a 36-hour version of the documentary and that he shot everything that is covered in the source material, the nonfiction book Atlas of an Occupied City, Amsterdam 1940–1945 by Bianca Stigter.

== Release ==
The film premiered at the 2023 Cannes Film Festival as a special screening on 17 May 2023. It also screened at the 50th Telluride Film Festival on 31 August 2023.

A24 released the film in North America and New Regency released it internationally, while September Film released it in the Netherlands. The film was released in the United States on 25 December 2023 and in the United Kingdom and Ireland on 9 February 2024 through Modern Films, with a nationwide live Q&A from the Barbican Centre in London.

=== Extended cut ===
The Rijksmuseum in Amsterdam presented a 34-hour version of the film that was projected silently and continuously onto the museum’s south façade from 12 September 2025 until 25 January 2026.

During that time, in the museum’s auditorium, a version with sound and voice-over was shown during museum hours on selected days, including a full continuous screening of the entire 34-hour version that ran from the morning of 11 October 2025 until evening the following day.

== Reception ==
=== Critical response ===
The review aggregator website Rotten Tomatoes reported an approval rating of 65% based on 37 reviews with an average rating of 6.9/10. The website's critics consensus reads, "Occupied City is an impressively ambitious attempt to connect the past with the present, although its repetitive approach and overwhelming length will be too much for many viewers." Metacritic assigned the film a weighted average score of 77 out of 100 based on 14 critics, indicating "generally favorable reviews".

Reviewing the film following its Cannes premiere, Peter Bradshaw of The Guardian called it a "monumental film" that "allows its emotional implication to amass over its running time."

== Accolades ==
Year	Award / Film Festival	Category	Recipient(s)	Result	Ref.
2023	Cannes Film Festival	L'Œil d'or	Steve McQueen	Nominated	
2023	British Independent Film Awards	Best Documentary	Steve McQueen	Nominated	
2024	Golden Calf	Best Long Documentary	Steve McQueen	Won	
