= Nasielsk =

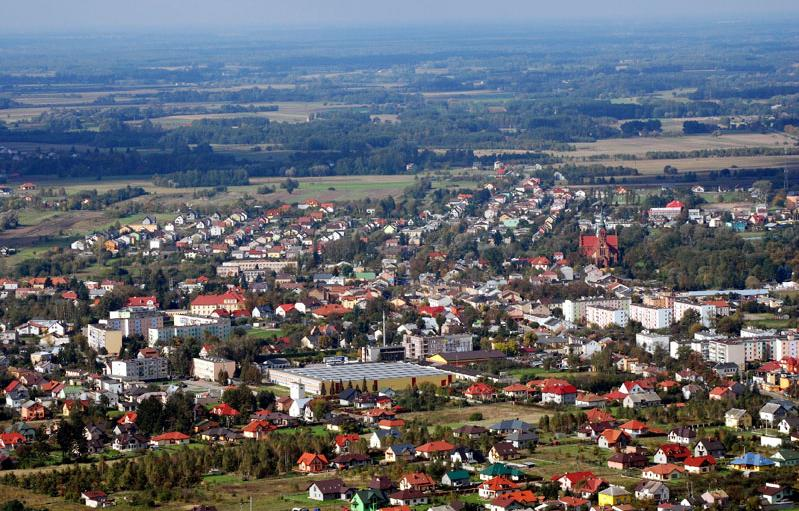
- Aerial view of the town

- Flag Coat of arms

- Location within Poland
- Coordinates: 52°35′12″N 20°48′45″E
- Country: Poland
- Voivodeship: Masovian
- County: Nowy Dwór
- Gmina: Nasielsk
- Established: 9th century
- First mentioned: 1065
- Town rights: 1386

Government
  - Mayor: Radosław Kasiak

Area
  - Total: 12.67 km^{2} (4.89 sq mi)

Population (2020)
  - Total: 7,650
  - Density: 604/km^{2} (1,560/sq mi)
- Time zone: UTC+1 (CET)
  - Summer (DST): UTC+2 (CEST)
- Postal code: 05-190
- Area code: +48 23
- Car plates: WND
- Website: https://nasielsk.pl/

Nasielsk [ˈnaɕɛlsk] is a town in the Masovian Voivodeship, in northeast Poland, approximately 50 kilometres (31 mi) north of Warsaw. It the seat of Gmina Nasielsk within Nowy Dwór County.

== History ==
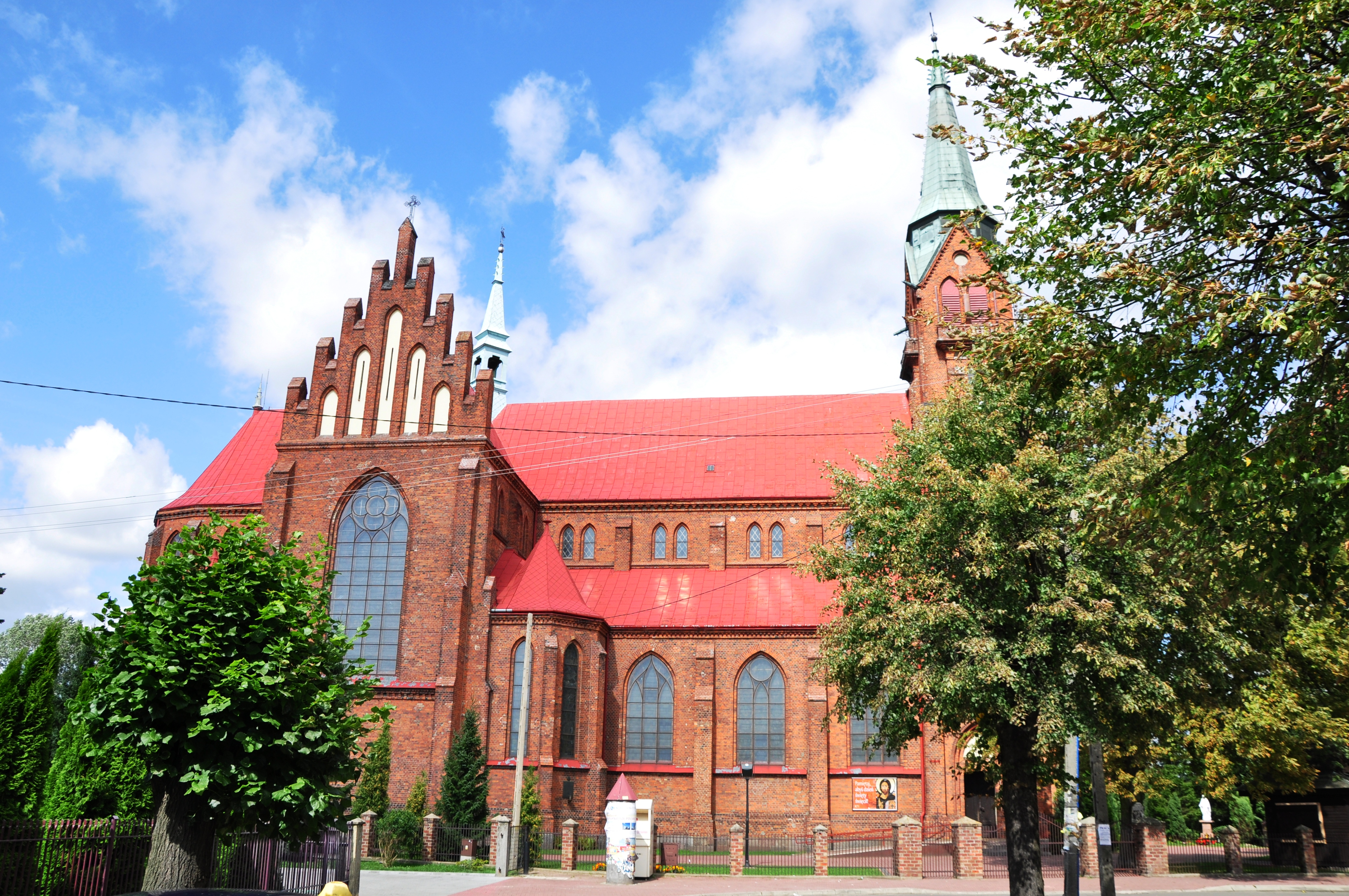
Saint Adalbert church in Nasielsk

An early Lechitic (proto-Polish) fortified settlement was built in the 9th century, and the region became part of the emerging Polish state in the 10th century. Nasielsk was first mentioned as Nosidlsk in 1065, in the so-called Mogilno Falsification of King Boleslaus II the Generous for the Benedictine Abbey at Mogilno. As the document states, the gord of Nosidlsk was an important center of defence, trade and administration. In the past, the name of the town was spelled in different forms: Nasilzco, Nosidlsk, Nosylsk, Nosydlsk, Nosielsk, Nosselia, Nosidlsko, Nasidlsko, Nosilsko, Nasilsko, Nasylsco. In 1155, a document issued for Duke Boleslaus IV the Curly confirmed the existence of the gord at Nasielsk, stating that Nowa Wies near Nasielsk was granted to the abbey of Czerwińsk nad Wisłą. In 1257, Duke of Siemowit I of Masovia granted one-third of Nasielsk to the Czerwinsk Abbey.

By the late 13th century, Nasielsk emerged as the seat of a castellany. The first document that confirms this fact was issued in 1297, with the notice of "comes Thomas castellanus de Nosylk”. On November 11, 1386, Janusz I of Warsaw granted the remaining part of the town of Nasielsk (civitas Nostra Nosielsko) to the knight Jakusz of Radzanow (Prawdzic coat of arms). Jakusz, who came to be known as Jakusz Bialy of Nasielsk, became the castellan of Nasielsk, and the town remained the property of his family until 1647. The coat of arms of Nasielsk is based on the Prawdzic symbol.

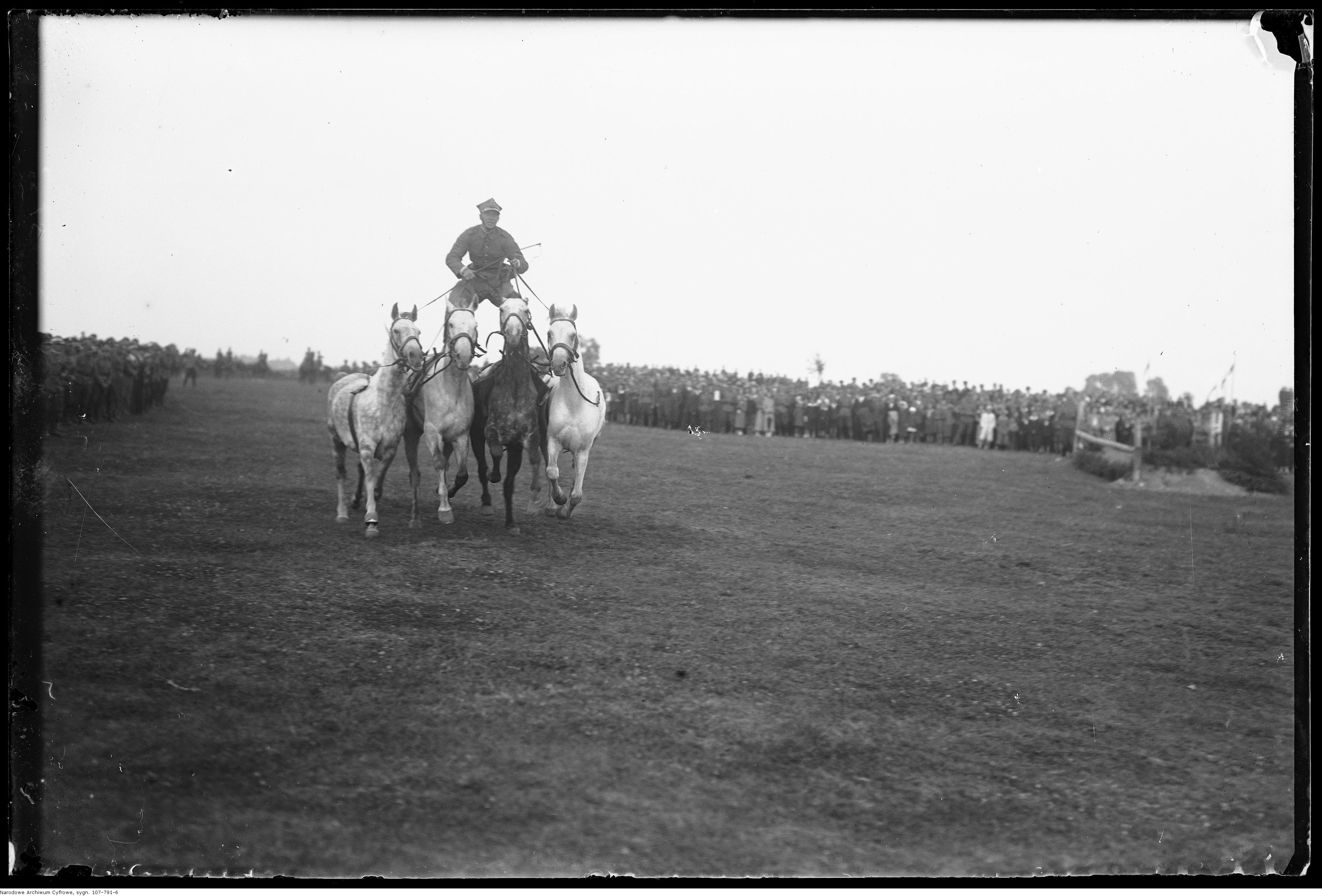
Horse riding competition in Nasielsk in 1936

The town with its wooden church of Saint Adalbert of Prague burned down in 1440, and five years later a new brick church was erected. Nasielsk for centuries remained in the private hands of the Nosielski and Wessel families. In the mid-18th century, the first synagogue was built, and in 1795, following the Third Partition of Poland, Nasielsk was incorporated into the Kingdom of Prussia, where it remained until 1807, when it became part of the short-lived Polish Duchy of Warsaw, and afterwards it was incorporated into Russian-controlled Congress Poland in 1815. Until 1866, Nasielsk was a private town. In 1877, a rail line from Warsaw to Gdańsk via Nasielsk was completed. The first official inventory of important buildings in Poland, A General View of the Nature of Ancient Monuments in the Kingdom of Poland, led by Kazimierz Stronczynski from 1844–55, describes the Nasielsk Synagogue as one of Poland's architecturally notable buildings.

In 1918, Nasielsk returned to Poland, as the country regained independence. During the Polish-Soviet War, in August 1920, Polish forces won the Battle of Nasielsk against the advancing Red Army. In 1924, the town became a rail junction after completion of a line to Toruń.

=== World War II ===
Following the German-Soviet invasion of Poland, which started World War II in September 1939, the town was occupied by Germany until 1945, and the population was subjected to repressions. In December 1939, the Jews of Nasielsk were expelled to other towns and cities where they fell victim to various atrocities and the Holocaust. In April 1940, the Germans arrested the pre-war Polish mayor Feliks Rostkowski, and imprisoned him in a concentration camp; however, he survived and returned to Nasielsk after the war. Several Poles who were either born or lived and worked in Nasielsk, were murdered by the Russians in the Katyn massacre in 1940. In December 1940, the Germans expelled around 1,000 Poles from the town. Expelled Poles were held in a camp in Działdowo for two weeks, where they were stripped of valuables, and then deported in freight trains to the Radom District of the General Government, while their houses and workshops were handed over to German colonists as part of the Lebensraum policy. From 1941 to 1943, the Germans operated a forced labour camp in the town.

The Soviet NKVD operated an assembly point for captured Polish resistance members in the town, who were then deported to Siberia. The Poles either returned to Poland later on, or died in Soviet captivity.

In 2009, Glenn Kurtz stumbled upon a home video shot by his family that included three minutes of footage in Nasielsk shot in 1938. Kurtz set out to restore the film and find the people in it. The book based on this journey is titled Three Minutes in Poland: Discovering a Lost World in a 1938 Family Film. In 2022, Bianca Stigter’s debut documentary Three Minutes: A Lengthening based on the book was released. It includes the three minute restored footage, with narration by Helena Bonham Carter. The film makes clear that in December 1939, Nasiellk's Jewish community was deported to regional ghettos, and ultimately to the Treblinka camp, where the remaining survivors perished.

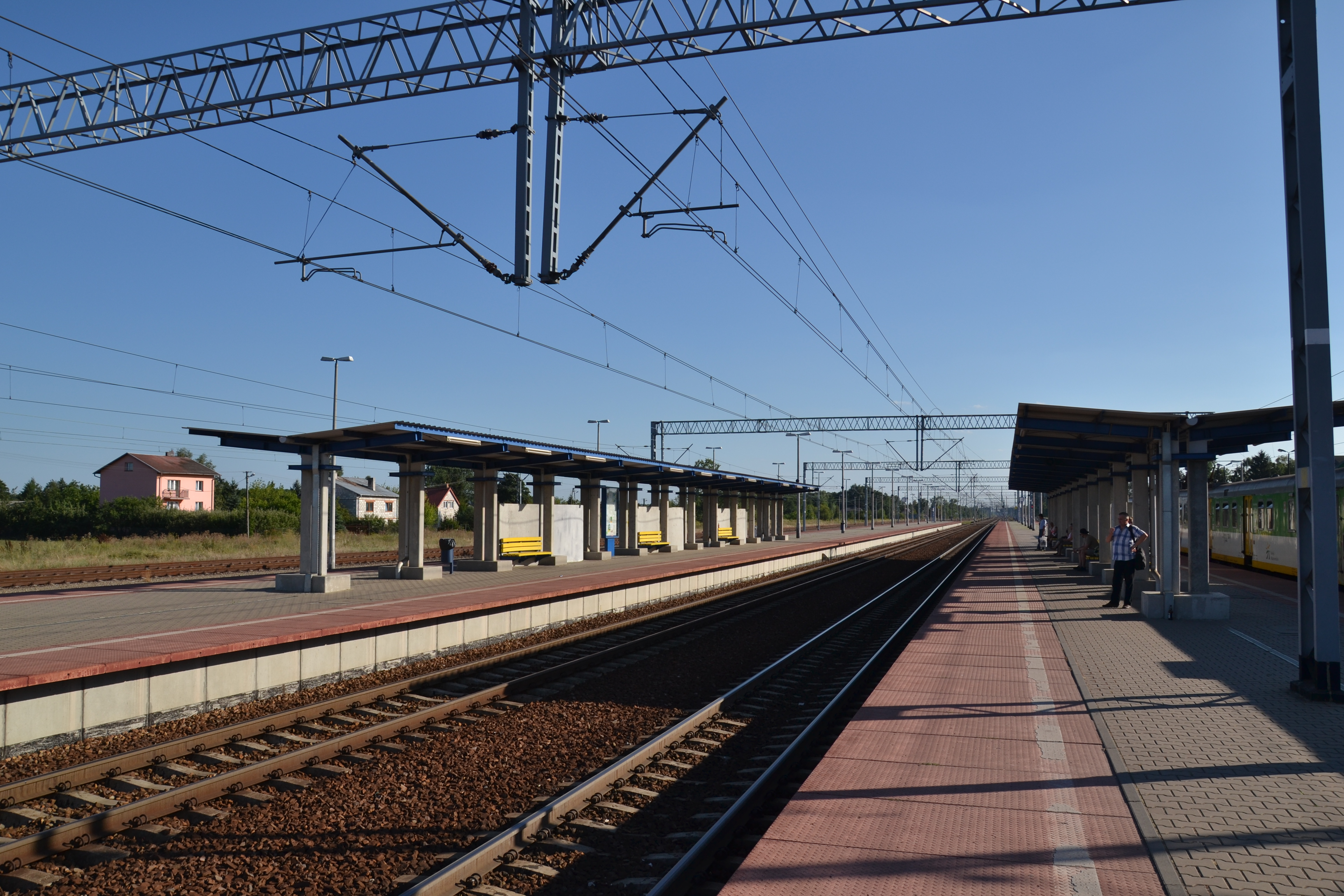
Nasielsk railway station, on the Warsaw-Gdańsk rail line

== Sports ==
The local football club is Żbik Nasielsk, with both men and women teams. Both teams compete in the lower leagues.

== Cuisine ==
The officially protected traditional food produced in Nasielsk is local cold pressed linseed oil (as designated by the Ministry of Agriculture and Rural Development of Poland). The tradition of oil production in Nasielsk and its surroundings dates back hundreds of years. The oldest mention of an oil mill in the present-day district of Nowa Wieś comes from 1474.

== Transport ==
Vovoideship roads 632 and 571 pass straight through Nasielsk.

Nasielsk has a station on the Gdańsk-Warsaw railway line. The Koleje Mazowieckie (Rail) Lines R90 and RE9 run frequently from Warszawa Gdańsk station to Nasielsk. The journey takes 1 hour.

A railway line of secondary importance runs from Nasielsk to Toruń.

Direct bus routes from Warsaw to Nasielsk do exist but are less frequent than trains.

== Notable people ==
- Leeser Rosenthal (1794–1868), Jewish book collector
- Dovid Bornsztain (1876–1942), third Sochatchover Rebbe
- Ola Jordan (born 1982), Polish-British professional dancer on the British TV show Strictly Come Dancing
- Renata Mauer (born 1969), sports shooter, double Olympic champion
- Tomasz Majewski (born 1981), shot putter, double Olympic champion
- Jarosław Jarząbkowski (born 1988) professional counter-strike player

== Notable fictional characters from Nasielsk ==
T. O. Morrow (real name Tomek Ovadya Morah), DC Comics supervillain
