= Three Minutes: A Lengthening =

- Directed by: Bianca Stigter
- Based on: Three Minutes in Poland: Discovering a Lost World in a 1938 Family Film by Glenn Kurtz
- Produced by: Floor Onrust
- Narrated by: Helena Bonham Carter
- Edited by: Katharina Wartena
- Production companies: Family Affairs Films; Lammas Park
- Distributed by: CinemaDelicatessen (Netherlands); Curzon Film (United Kingdom)
- Release date: 7 April 2022
- Running time: 69 minutes
- Countries: Netherlands; United Kingdom
- Languages: English; Polish; German; Yiddish

Three Minutes: A Lengthening is a 2022 documentary film directed by Bianca Stigter.

== Summary ==
The film examines three minutes of footage shot of the Jewish community in the Polish town of Nasielsk in 1938, shortly before it was decimated during the Holocaust. The film is based on the 2014 non-fiction book Three Minutes in Poland: Discovering a Lost World in a 1938 Family Film by American musician Glenn Kurtz, whose grandfather David shot the footage. The documentary is narrated by Helena Bonham Carter.

== Background ==
In 1938 Nasielsk had an estimated population of 7000, of whom around 3000 were Jewish. In December 1939, much of the town's Jewish community was deported to various ghettoes around Poland, including the Warsaw Ghetto; from there, many were ultimately transported to Treblinka, an extermination camp. Only around 100 members of Nasielsk's Jewish community survived the Holocaust.

== Production ==
David Kurtz was born in Poland but emigrated with his wife Liza to the United States in the 1890s, going on to become a successful businessman in Brooklyn, New York City. In 1938, he went on a holiday around Europe, and filmed his trip.

In 2009 Kurtz's grandson Glenn found the footage in Kurtz's home in Palm Beach, Florida. Among the footage was three minutes of a Jewish community in a then-unknown location. The footage was shared with the United States Holocaust Memorial Museum, who restored it and posted it on their website. In 2011, Maurice Chandler's granddaughter recognised him in the footage; Chandler subsequently identified the footage as being of the Jewish community in Nasielsk. Chandler had survived the Holocaust by remaining in Poland using false identification documents. Kurtz documented the discovery of the footage, as well as the process of identifying its location as well as the people within it, in his book Three Minutes in Poland, which was published in 2014.

Of Nasielsk's estimated 3000-strong Jewish community, 150 members are featured in the footage, although less than 15 were able to have their identities recognised.

Three Minutes consists almost entirely of Kurtz's original footage, with the exception of a brief scene showing a digital reconstruction of Nasielsk's market square as it would have appeared at the time the footage was shot.

== Reception ==
The film currently has a 100% rating on Rotten Tomatoes, indicating critical acclaim. The website's critics consensus reads, "Three Minutes - A Lengthening movingly captures a moment in time while honoring lives soon to be cut short by unimaginable horror." In the United Kingdom, the film premiered on BBC Four, where it aired as part of the channel's Storyville series to mark Holocaust Memorial Day on 27 January 2023. As of February 2023 it is available for over a year on BBC iPlayer.
