= Mogilno Falsification =

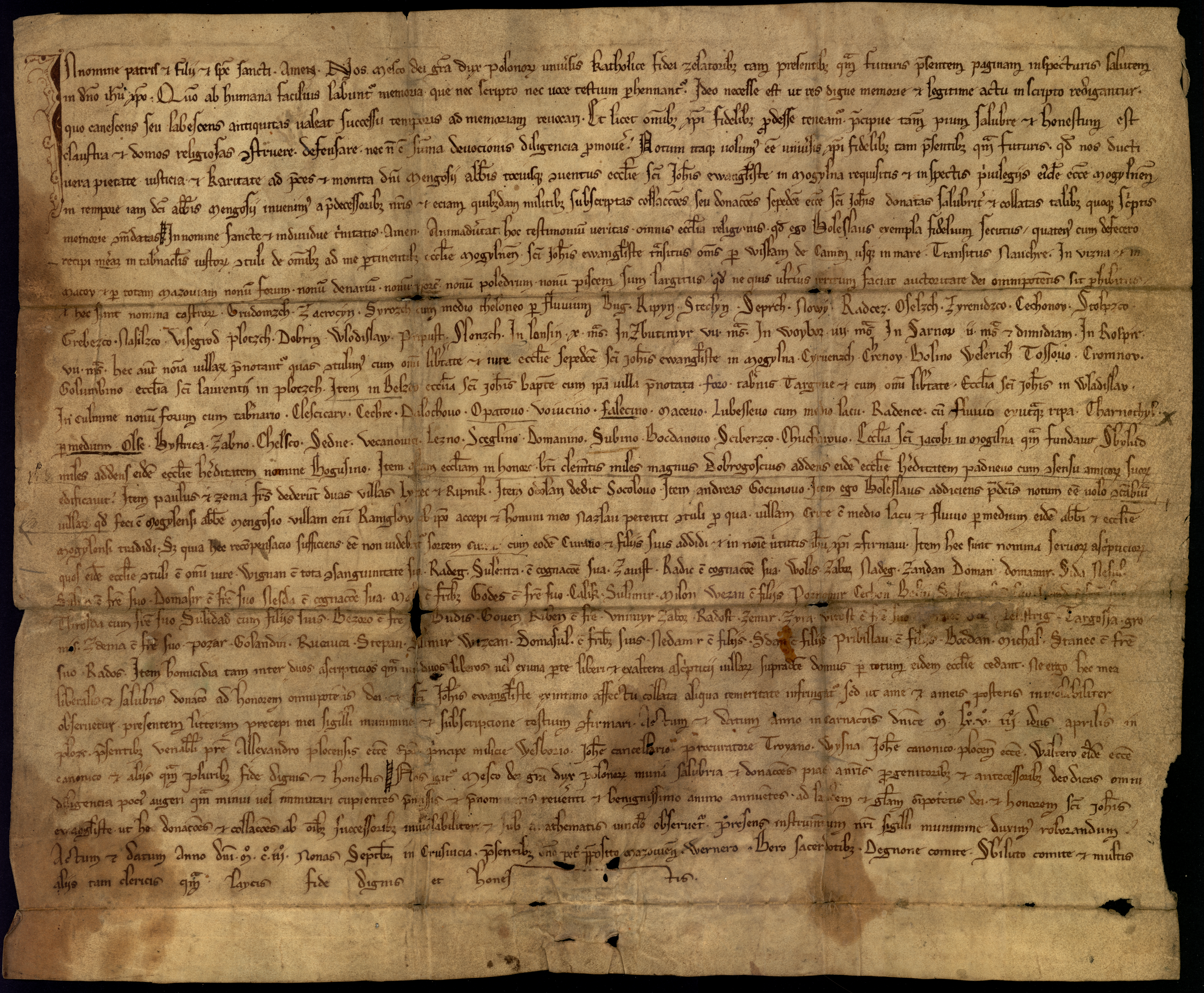
The Mogilno Falsification

The Mogilno Falsification (Polish: falsyfikat mogileński) is a medieval document, allegedly issued in Płock in 1065. Most probably, however, it was issued in the mid 12th century (c. 1155). The document specified newly acquired properties of a Benedictine Abbey located in Mogilno, Kingdom of Poland. Among the properties of the abbey were 23 towns from Greater Poland and Kujawy, seven villages from Mazovia, and the income of five gords, located in the Lands of Łęczyca and Sieradz.

According to a late medieval chronicler Jan Długosz, the document was issued and signed by King Bolesław II the Generous. This theory was disproved by researchers, who claim that the Mogilno Falsification comes from mid-12th century, when organizational structure of Polish Catholic Church was rebuilt.

The Falsification, regardless of its age, remained one of the most important sources describing early medieval settlements in northern and central Poland. Several location were first mentioned in this document. Among them are Grudusk, Zakroczym, Serock, Rypin, Steklin, Sierpc, Nowy Raciąż, Szreńsk, Ciechanów, Stupsk, Grzebsk, Nasielsk, Wyszogród, Płock, Dobrzyń, Włocławek, Przypust, Słońsk, Ciechrz (as Cechre), Serock (Syrozch).

== See also ==
- Sankt Florian Psalter
