= Leeser Rosenthal =

Jewish book collector

Leeser (Eliezer) Rosenthal (1794–1868) was a Jewish book collector in the first half of the nineteenth century.

Leeser Rosenthal was born on 13 April 1794 in Nasielsk, a small town near Warsaw, in what was then the Polish–Lithuanian Commonwealth. His forebears had been teachers and rabbis. He died at the age of 74 in Germany on 17 August 1868. He became a rabbi in Hanover where he married Zippora Sophie Blumenthal, with whom he had three children: Mathilde (1839–unknown), George (1828–1909), Nanny (1835–unknown). His wife, a descendant of the rich banker Michael David, made it possible for Rosenthal to finance his collection. During his lifetime he assembled a large collection of books, which was considered to be the largest private collection of Germany in his field at the time. Among other things it contains a lot of Judaica and Hebraica, such as a complete assembly of the Wolf Heidenheim press in Rödelheim. At the time of Rosenthal's death he possessed around 6,000 volumes, thirty-two manuscripts and twelve incunabula of Hebrew origin. He was especially interested in writings about the Jewish view on enlightenment. He kept his books in a room at the Bergstrasse (Hanover). This was the same room where David Oppenheim had stored his collection before his collection was sold.

After Rosenthal's death his son, George Rosenthal, donated the collection to university of Amsterdam in 1880. Though the Germans sequestered the collection, it survived World War II and was returned to the University of Amsterdam under the name Bibliotheca Rosenthalina.
