= Lia Diskin =

Journalist

- Born: Leonor Beatriz Diskin Pawlowicz; October 27, 1950 (age 75); Buenos Aires

Lia Diskin (born Leonor Beatriz Diskin Pawlowicz; October 27, 1950) is an Argentine journalist and founder of Associação Palas Athena, a Brazilian philanthropy NGO.

In 2020, she was awarded the Padma Shri, India's fourth highest civilian award, due to being "actively involved in the promotion of Gandhian values of peace and non-violence for the past four decades".

== Early life ==
Leonor Beatriz Diskin was born in Buenos Aires, Argentina on October 27, 1950. Her paternal grandparents were Russian and her mother Bulgarian.

She emigrated to Brazil at the age of 21, during the Argentine dictatorship, while waiting for her husband, Basílio, to finish his studies in the US.

== Awards and honors ==
- 2010: Jamnalal Bajaj International Award for promoting Gandhian values outside India
- 2020: Padma Shri by Indian government
