= Yosef Engel =

Polish Hasidic rabbi

Personal life
- Born: December 7, 1858 Tarnów, Austrian Galicia, Austrian Empire
- Died: October 25, 1919 (aged 60) Vienna, Austria

Religious life
- Religion: Judaism

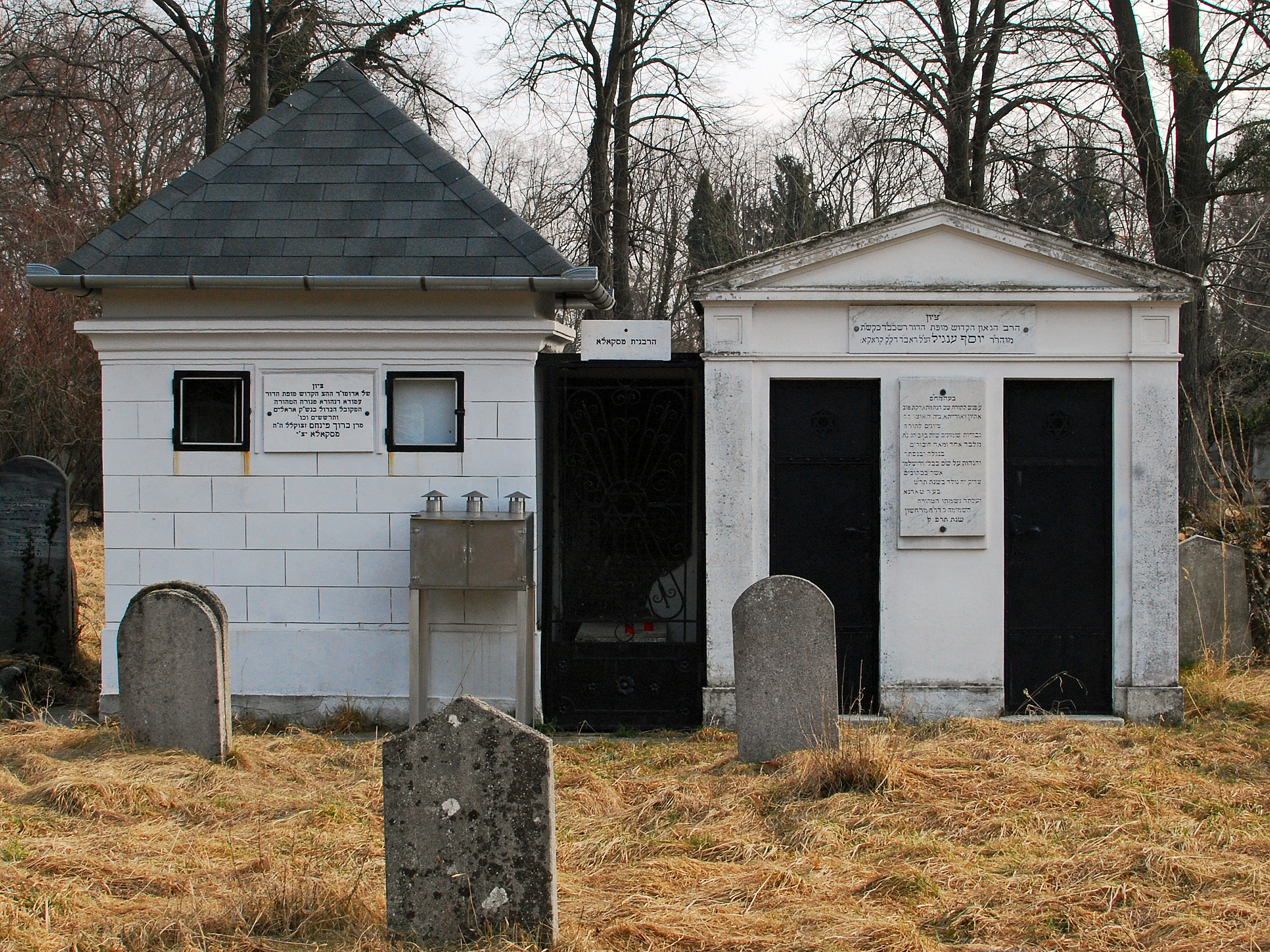
Engel's grave

Rabbi Yosef Engel (7 December 1858 - 25 October 1919 ) was an author of Torah scholarship and an Av Beit Din (chief rabbinical judge) in Kraków, Poland. He was known for his unique combination of creative conceptual thinking and vast breadth of knowledge of Rabbinic literature. Although only a fraction of his many writings have survived, several of them have become staples of contemporary Yeshiva learning.

== Biography ==
Yosef Engel was born in the town of Tarnów, in modern-day southeastern Poland in 1858. His father was a merchant and a Talmid Chakham (Torah scholar), and his mother came from the Sanz Hasidic dynasty. As a child, she took him to visit Rabbi Chaim Halberstam of Sanz, known as the Divrei Chaim. Already in childhood, he was known as the "Ilui (prodigy) of Tarnów."

Initially, he studied with a melamed (private teacher), but soon began studying on his own and achieved remarkable proficiency. In his youth, he studied in chavruta (paired study) with his relative Rabbi Shmuel Engel, head of the Rabbinical Court of Radomyśl Wielki, and also learned with his friend, Rabbi Meir Arik.

For a time, Rabbi Engel lived in Będzin, then within Russian-controlled Congress Poland, without holding Russian citizenship, which led to accusations against him. During the Russo-Japanese War (1906), the Russian authorities nationalized the building in which his wife had invested most of their wealth. As a result, the family relocated to Kraków, where he began as a Dayan (rabbinical judge) and was soon appointed Av Beit Din, a position he held until the outbreak of World War I.

Because of the war, in 1914 (5674), he was forced to move to Vienna, Austria, where he lived until his death on 1 Cheshvan 5680 (1919). His funeral in Vienna was attended by around 20,000 people. His only daughter was married to Rabbi Yitzchak Menachem Morgenstern, who published some of Rabbi Engel's writings.

According to Rabbi Menachem Mendel Kasher, Rabbi Engel participated in a rabbinical conference in Vienna, summoned by the Austro-Hungarian government, which tried to pressure rabbis to sign a declaration opposing the Balfour Declaration. Rabbi Engel is said to have prevented the signing by exclaiming: "The hand that signs will be cut off!"

== Method of Study ==
Rabbi Engel’s style of learning, as reflected in his writings, is marked by two main features, also seen in the writings of his contemporary, the Rogatchover Gaon:

1. Analytical Synthesis

Rabbi Engel built his Torah insights by gathering numerous Talmudic sources and identifying a unifying conceptual core among them, even when they dealt with different legal topics. Unlike the Rogatchover, who wrote concisely and cryptically, Rabbi Engel expressed himself clearly and fluently, making his deep definitions accessible to scholars.

2. Innovative Dialectical Inquiries

Rabbi Engel contributed significantly to the development of Talmudic chakira (analytical inquiry) by focusing on abstract conceptual dilemmas. A famous example is his question: “Does quantity outweigh quality?” This question applies to topics like whether one large donation is better than many small ones, or whether numerous small sins outweigh one severe transgression.

== Works ==
Rabbi Engel’s writings display vast knowledge of Talmudic literature and remain classical examples of Talmudic sharpness and dialectic. His essay Gevurot Shemonim presents eighty answers to a single Talmudic difficulty. He was also well-versed in Kabbalah, and mystical thought influenced his Talmudic style, as well as vice versa.

He began writing at a young age, often noting in his manuscripts: "While idle in my youth..." Throughout his life, he amassed a large corpus of writings. Dovid Morgenstern, the grandson of Rabbi Engel, attested that his grandfather wrote over 120 volumes in his lifetime, 103 of which were lost during the Holocaust. The only unpublished manuscript Morgenstern managed to take with him as he escaped from the Nazis was Rabbi Engel's insights on the Maharit and Avnei Miluim on the tractate of Kiddushin. He therefore aptly named it "She'erit Yosef", the remnant of Yosef.

The following are the published written works of Rabbi Engel:

- Beit HaOtzar – An encyclopedia of Talmudic and halachic concepts. Only the first two volumes (Aleph and part of Bet) were published. His grandson wrote that about 20 volumes were completed in manuscript but lost during WWII.
- Lekach Tov – Talmudic dialectics.
- Atvan D’Orayta – Deep Talmudic inquiries.
- Shiv’im Panim LaTorah – Seventy resolutions to a contradiction in statements by Rav Ashi in the Talmud.
- Gevurot Shemonim – Eighty answers to one Talmudic question.
- Otzrot Yosef – Novel interpretations on Yoreh De'ah, laws of Shemitah, Kabbalistic essays, and responsa.
- Gilyonei HaShas – Notes and insights on Bavli and Yerushalmi on Seder Zera’im, Moed, Nashim and Nezikin.
- Shev D’Nechamata – Aggadic work written in memory of his mother.
- Chosen Yosef (or She’erit Yosef) – Insights on Tractate Kiddushin and commentaries of the Maharit and Avnei Miluim.
- Tziyunim LaTorah – Concise Talmudic inquiries.
- Ben Porat – Responsa in two volumes.

A Torah Institute (Ohavei Torah) was recently established to publish his works anew.
