= Diskin (surname) =

Diskin is a surname. Notable people with the surname include:

- Avraham Diskin (born 1947), Israeli political scientist
- Benjamin Diskin (fl. from 1987), American voice actor
- Lia Diskin (born 1950), full name Leonor Beatriz Diskin Pawlowicz, Argentine journalist
- Matt Diskin (born 1982), British rugby league coach
- Vilunya Diskin (born 1941), American author
- Yehoshua Leib Diskin (1818–1898), also known as Maharil Diskin, a leading rabbi, Talmudist, Biblical commentator, and founder of Diskin Orphanage
- Yuval Diskin (born 1956), 12th Director of the Israeli Internal Security Service Shabak
