= Meyer Roest =

Meijer Marcusz Roest (19 December 1821, in Amsterdam – 20 November 1889, in Amsterdam) was a Dutch bibliographer.

== Life ==
When Roest became connected with a firm of booksellers in Amsterdam, he acquired a taste for bibliographical studies, and as a result published in 1857 Catalogue de livres orientaux. Roest's best-known work is the Catalog der Hebraica und Judaica aus der L. Rosenthal'schen Bibliothek (2 vols., Amsterdam, 1875). After Baron George Rosenthal presented his collection to the Amsterdam Library, Roest was appointed custodian of it. He contributed to various Jewish periodicals, such as the Dutch Spectator and the Taalkundig Magazin, and edited the (non-Jewish) Navorscher and Israelietische Nieuwsbode for several years.

== Bibliography ==
Jew. Chron. Jan. 3, 1891, p. 14.S.
