= Adath Israel Congregation (Toronto) =

Conservative synagogue in Ontario, Canada

Coordinates: 43.738°N 79.4311°W

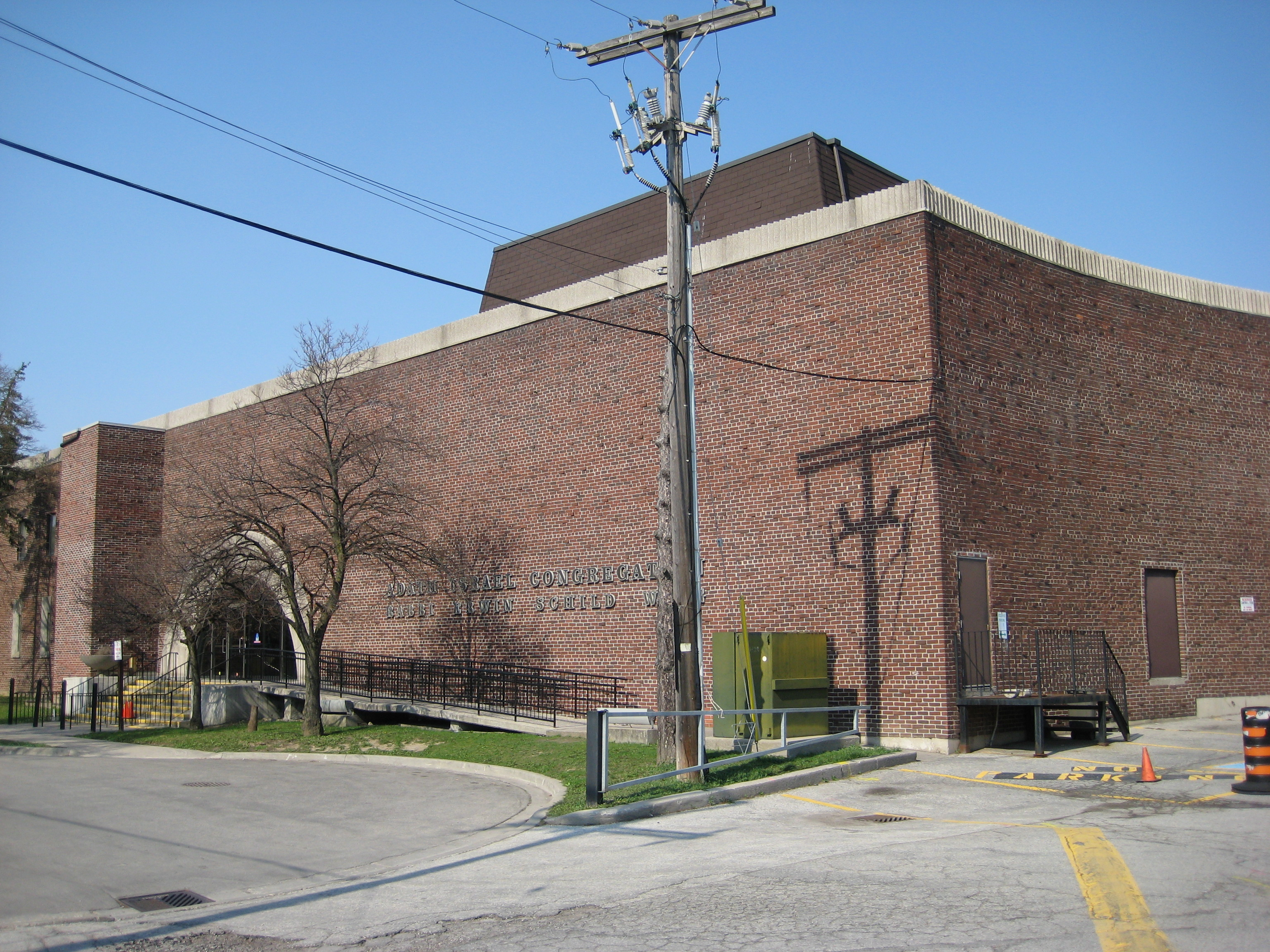
- Adath Israel Congregation

Religion
- Affiliation: Conservative Judaism
- Leadership: Rabbi Adam Cutler; Cantor Alex Stein
- Status: Active

Location
- Location: 37 Southbourne Avenue; Toronto, Ontario; M3H 1A4
- Interactive map of Adath Israel Congregation

Architecture
- Completed: 1957

Website
- adathisrael.com

Adath Israel Congregation is a Conservative synagogue located at 37 Southbourne Avenue in the North York district of Toronto, Ontario. It is one of the largest Conservative Synagogues in Canada, with approximately 1,450 member families.

== History ==
Adath Israel was founded in 1903 by Jewish immigrants from Romania as the First Roumanian Hebrew Congregation Adath Israel. New immigrants from Romania first met in a rental space, later moving to the congregation's first permanent home on Centre Avenue. In 1911 the synagogue dedicated a new building on Bathurst Street near Dundas Street, where Abraham Kelman was the rabbi.

In 1947, Erwin Schild became the Rabbi. Over time, membership grew and the congregation relocated twice, finally settling in a new building constructed in North York. The formal name was shortened in the 1950s, and in 1957 the new building was officially dedicated.

In 1989, Schild retired and was succeeded as Senior Rabbi by Steven Saltzman, who died in September 2014. In 2012 Saltzman advocated allowing non-egalitarian synagogues to remain affiliated with Conservative Judaism.

In 2016, the synagogue’s membership consisted of 1,800 families.

In 2003, David C. Seed was hired as Rabbi, and retired in July, 2024, after 21 years of dedicated service.

In 2008, the congregation seceded from the United Synagogue of Conservative Judaism and affiliated with the now defunct Canadian Council of Conservative Synagogues.

In 2009, Australian born, Cantor Alex Stein was hired as the congregation’s new Cantor, following the retirement of Cantor Eli Kirshblum, after 42 years of dedicated service.

In 2014, Cantor Benjamin Sharpe was hired as Chazzan Sheni & Ritual Director, after Baruch Hoffman retired to Tzfat, Israel.

In 2015, Moshe Meirovich became Interim Senior Rabbi, following the death of Senior Rabbi, Steven Saltzman. In March 2018, Adam Cutler became the first Toronto-born rabbi to lead the congregation.

Rabbis Yerach and Nava Meiersdorf were each appointed to the position of Associate Rabbi, beginning July 1, 2024.
