= Mogilno =

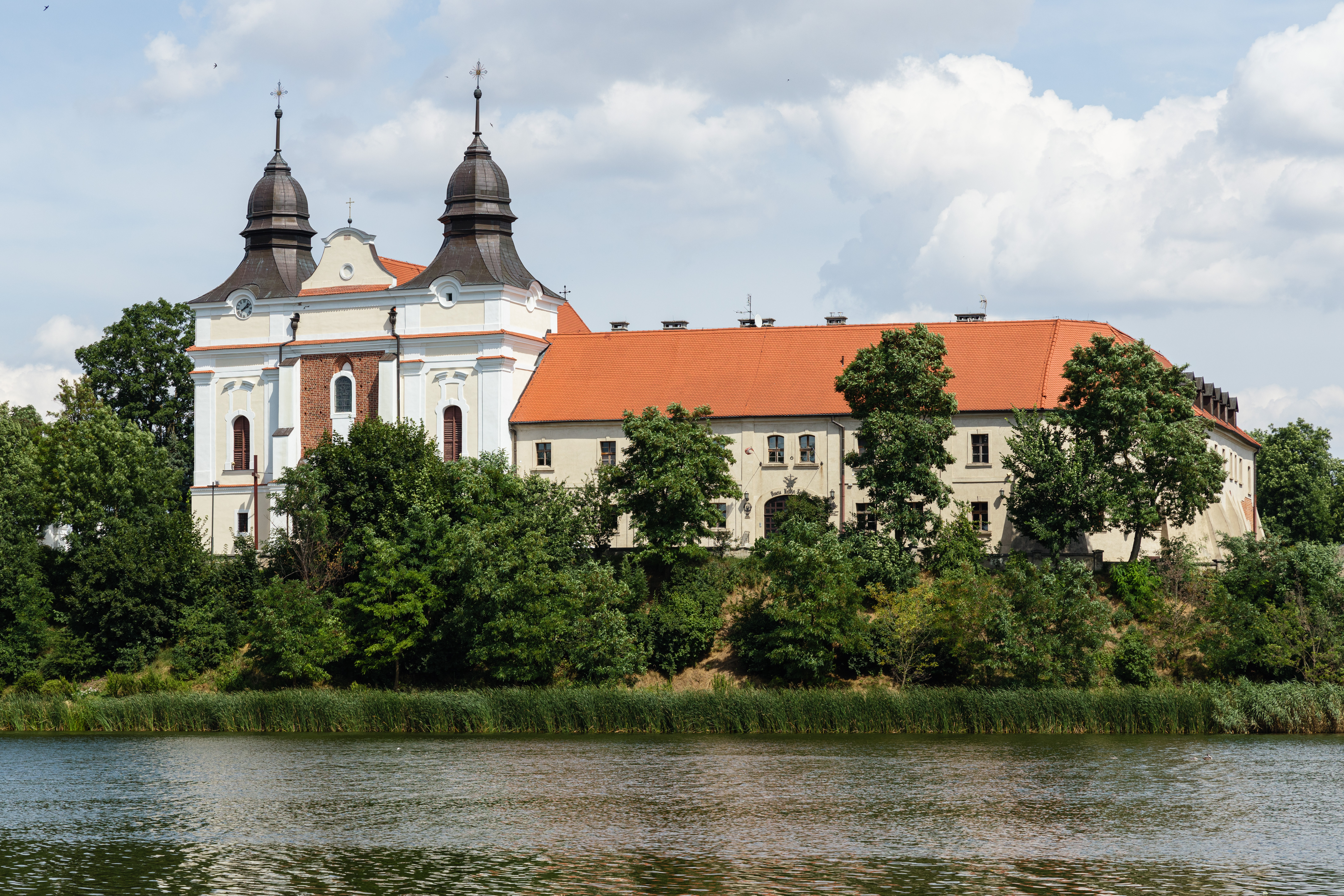
- Benedictine Monastery

- Flag Coat of arms

- Location within Poland
- Coordinates: 52°39′N 17°57′E
- Country: Poland
- Voivodeship: Kuyavian-Pomeranian
- County: Mogilno
- Gmina: Mogilno
- Town rights: 1398

Government
  - Mayor: Karol Nawrot (PSL)

Area
  - Total: 8.32 km^{2} (3.21 sq mi)

Population (31-12-2014)
  - Total: 12,240
  - Density: 1,471/km^{2} (3,810/sq mi)
- Time zone: UTC+1 (CET)
  - Summer (DST): UTC+2 (CEST)
- Postal code: 88-300
- Vehicle registration: CMG
- Climate: Dfb
- Website: Official website

Mogilno (English: /mɔːˈɡɪlnoʊ/; Polish: [mɔˈɡʲilnɔ]) is a town in central Poland, seat of the Mogilno County in the Kuyavian-Pomeranian Voivodeship.

== History ==
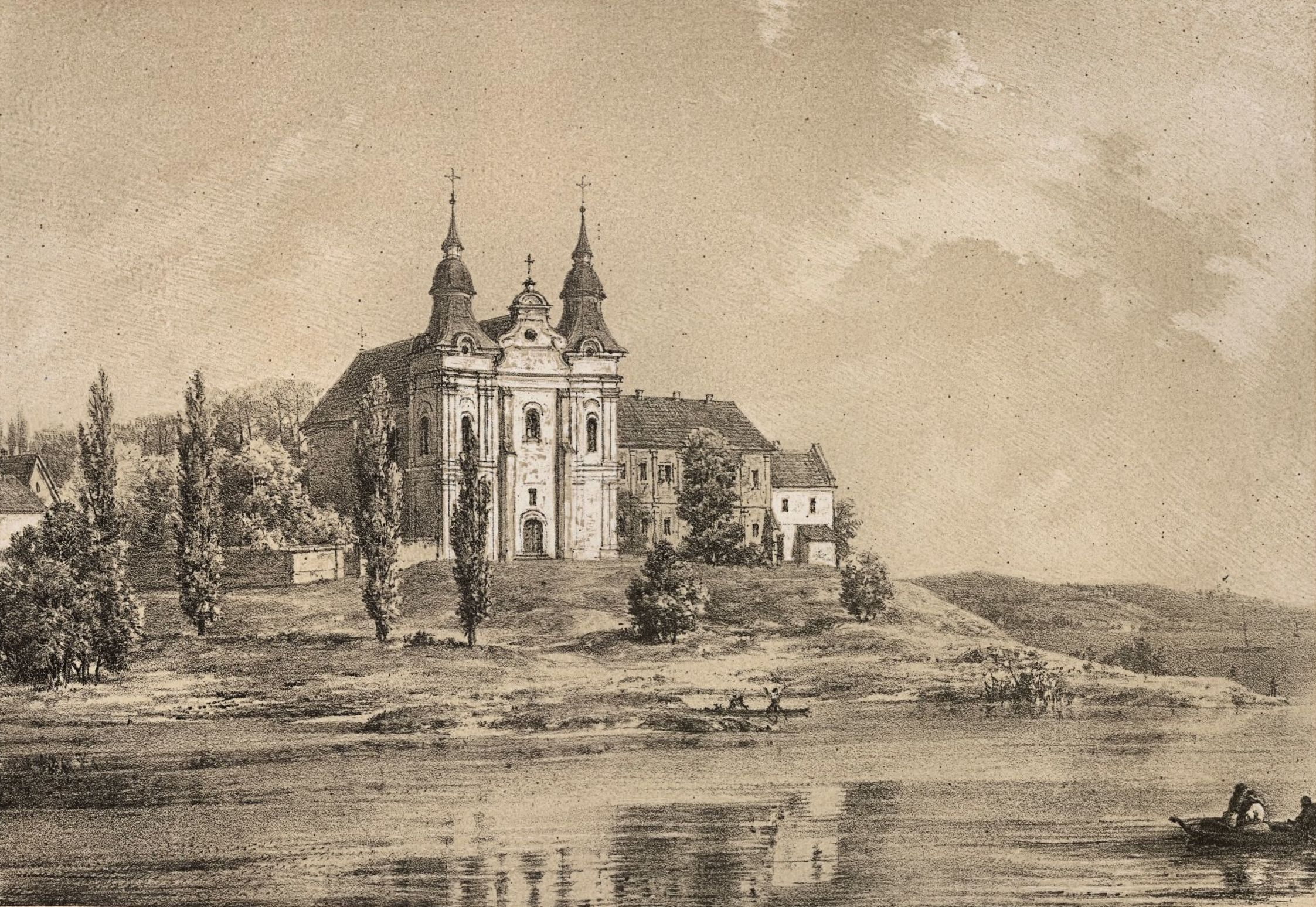
19th-century view of the Benedictine abbey

Mogilno is one of the oldest settlements along the border of the Greater Poland and Kuyavia historical regions. Since the turn of the 8th and 9th century until the 10th century an early-medieval settlement existed there, at the long narrow headland surrounded by waters of Mogilno Lake from the west and south and marshes from the east.

In 1065, a Benedictine abbey was founded there by Bolesław the Generous. North of the abbey a town later developed, which in 1398 was granted a town charter by King Władysław II Jagiełło, and which was the abbey's property until 1773. Administratively it was located in the Gniezno County in the Kalisz Voivodeship in the Greater Poland Province of the Kingdom of Poland.

After the First Partition of Poland in 1772 the town became a part of the Kingdom of Prussia. In local baptism records from 1792, the town is spelled Mogillno. After the successful Greater Poland uprising of 1806, it was regained by Poles and included within the Duchy of Warsaw, and after its dissolution, it was re-annexed by Prussia in 1815. In 1918, Poland regained independence, and shortly afterwards the Greater Poland uprising broke out, which goal was to reunite the town and region with the reborn Polish state. The town was liberated by Polish insurgents on 1 January 1919.

Since 1898 until his death in 1910 a parish priest in Mogilno's other church St. Jacob (Św. Jakuba) was Piotr Wawrzyniak.

=== Second World War ===
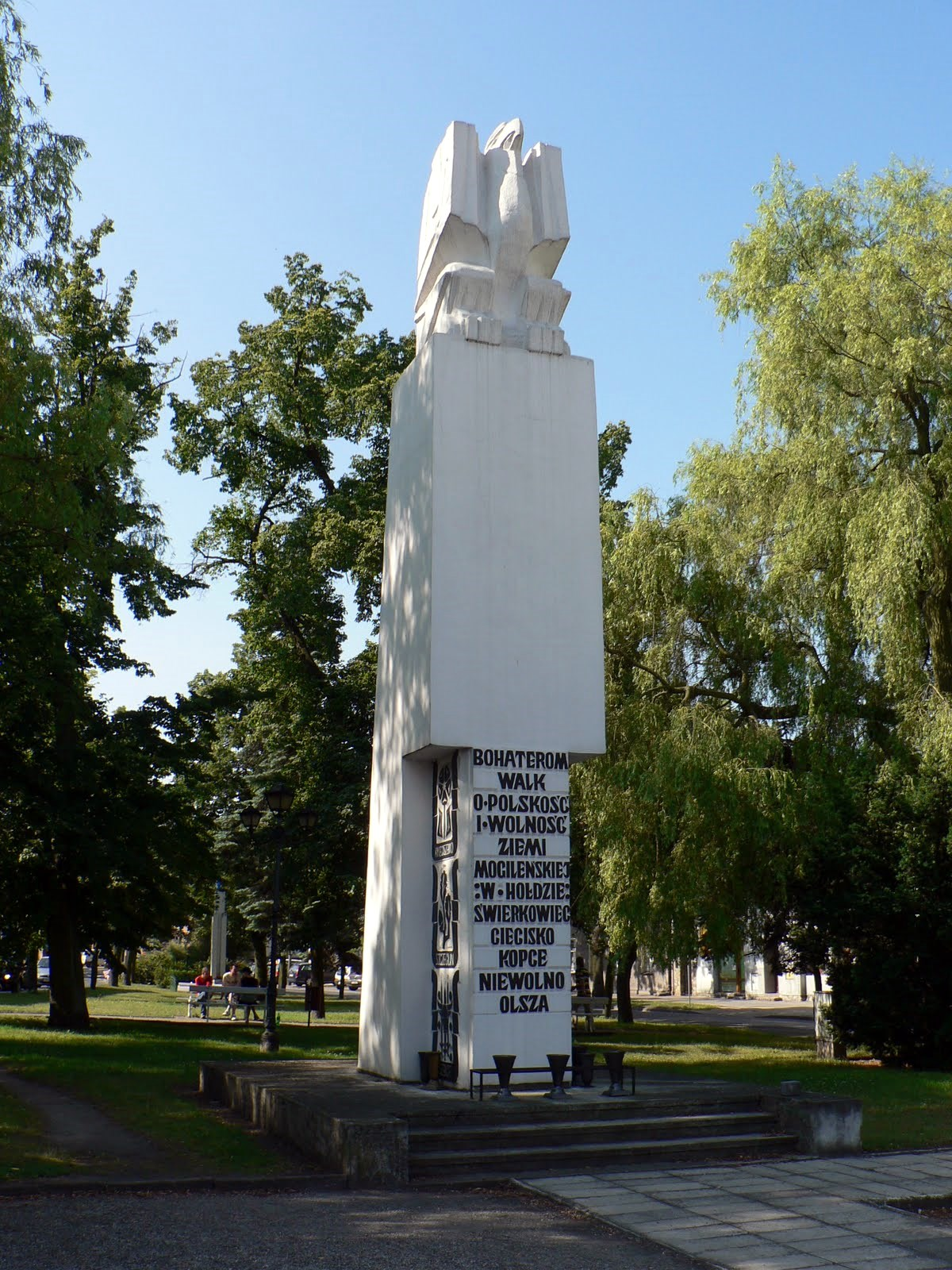
Monument to the Heroes of the Fight for Freedom of the Mogilno Land

During the German invasion of Poland at the start of World War II, it was the site of fierce Polish defense. On 18 September 1939, German forces incited by members of Mogilno German minority killed 40 Poles, one of whom was of Jewish descent. The victims were picked out by local Volksdeutsche with Polish citizenship for execution. The oldest victim was 75, the youngest 17. The first expulsions of Poles, mainly families of massacred Polish defenders and families of Poles who were murdered or deported to concentration camps during the Intelligenzaktion, as well as owners of larger houses, shops, workshops and barbershops, were carried out in November and December 1939. On 14–19 April 1940, during the Intelligenzaktion, the Gestapo carried out mass arrests of local Poles, who were then imprisoned in the local prison. Further expulsions of 491 Poles, including disabled and ill people, were carried out by the German police in 1941. Poles were deported to the General Government in the more-eastern part of German-occupied Poland, while their houses were handed over to Germans as part of the Lebensraum policy. From 1941 to 1943, the Germans operated a forced labour camp for Jewish men in the town.

The Polish resistance movement was active in Mogilno, including local units of the Wielkopolska Organizacja Wojskowa, Wojskowa Organizacja Ziem Zachodnich, Grey Ranks, Union of Armed Struggle and Home Army. Two Polish underground newspapers were printed in the town. In 1940, the Germans arrested the leaders of the local unit of Wojskowa Organizacja Ziem Zachodnich, who were then imprisoned in various Nazi prisons and eventually sentenced to death and beheaded in Poznań in 1942. Bogdan Friedrich, commander of the local unit of the Union of Armed Struggle was arrested by the Gestapo in mid-1942 and died in the Rawicz prison after a brutal interrogation, whereas Stanisław Szperka, commander of the local Home Army unit, was arrested by the Gestapo in August 1944; he died during his deportation from a prison in Żabikowo to the Sachsenhausen concentration camp. Several organizers of the local resistance units were also arrested in 1942–1944 and either murdered during Gestapo interrogations or sentenced to death and executed.

== Sights ==
Sights of Mogilno (examples)

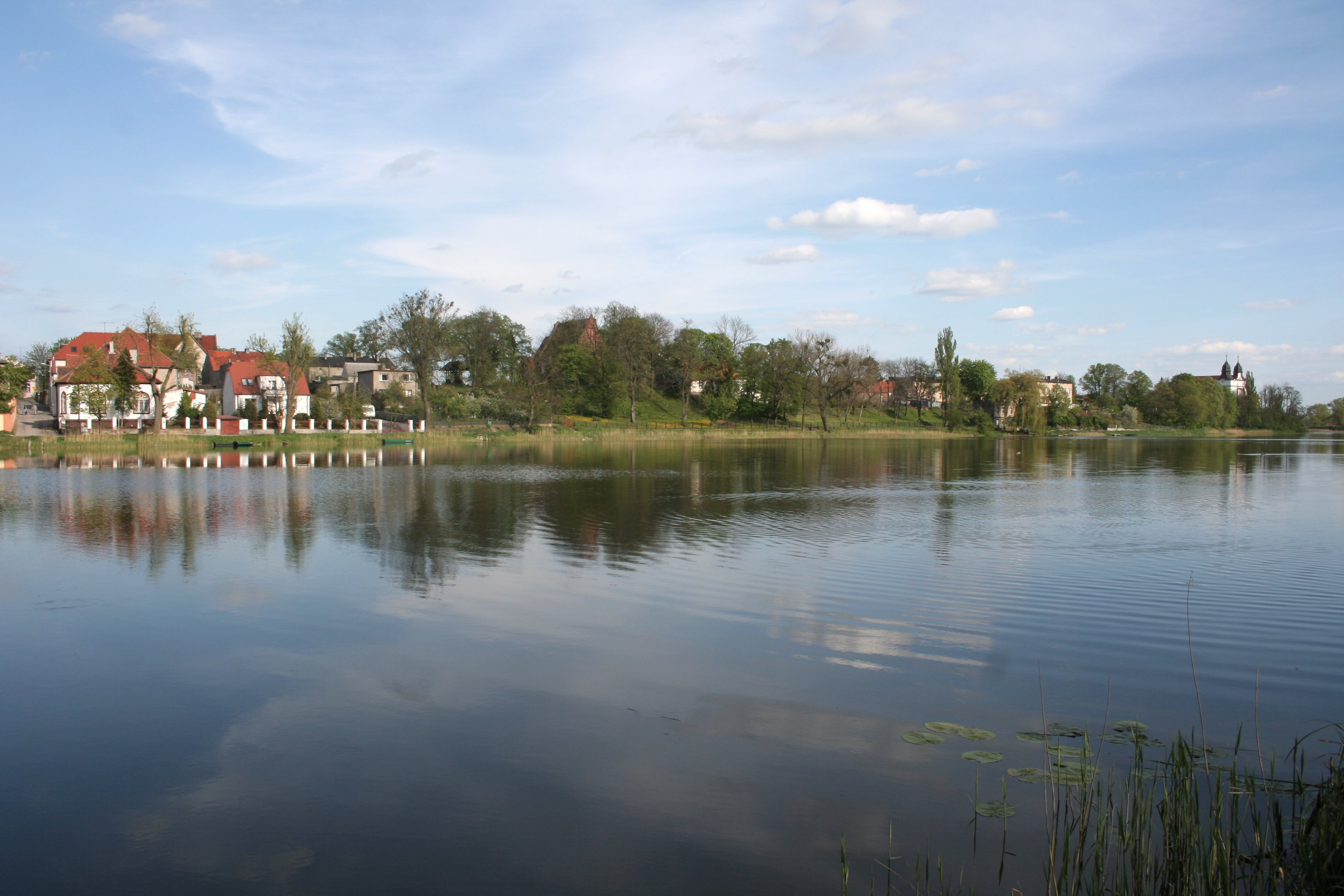
Mogilno Lake

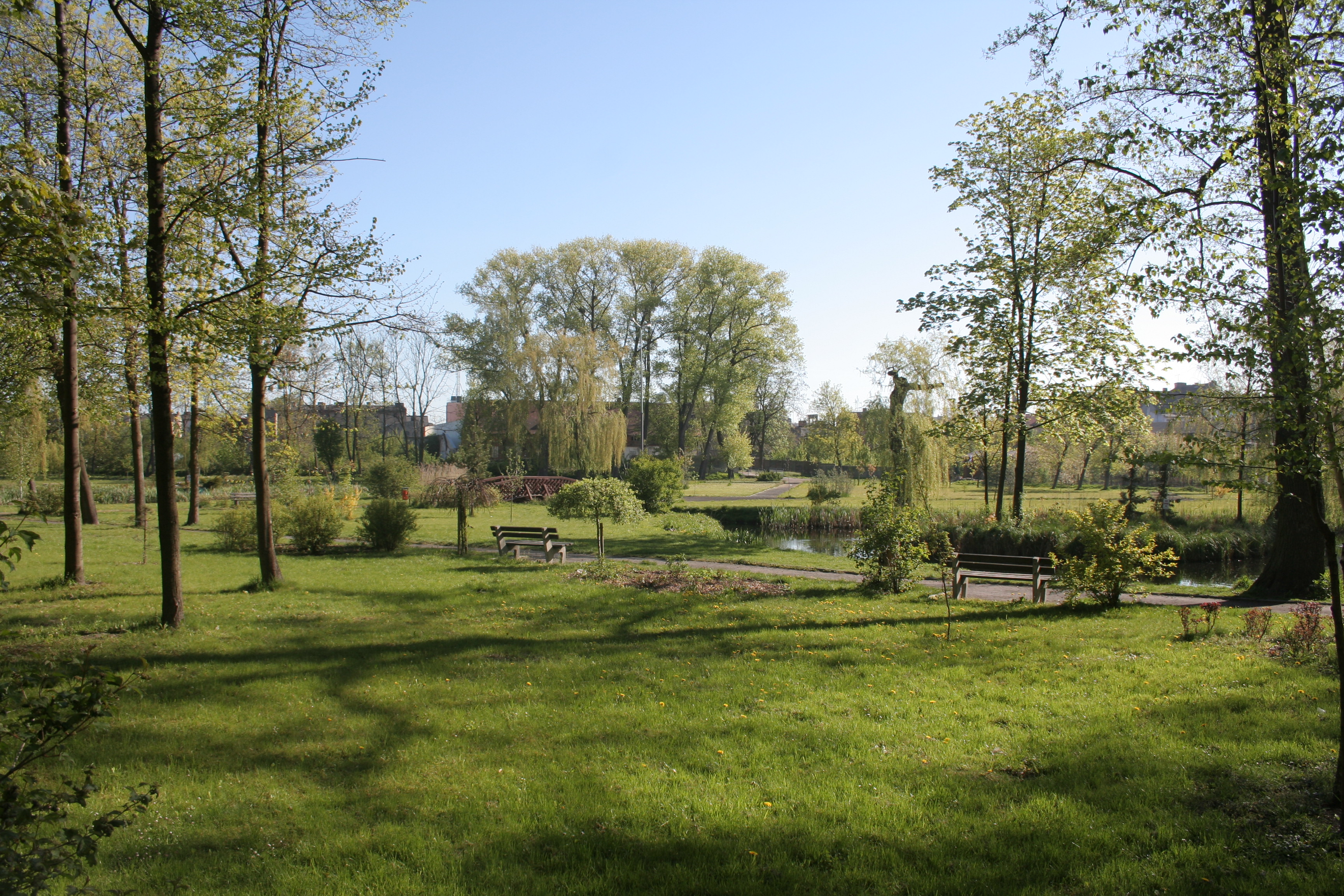
Municipal Park

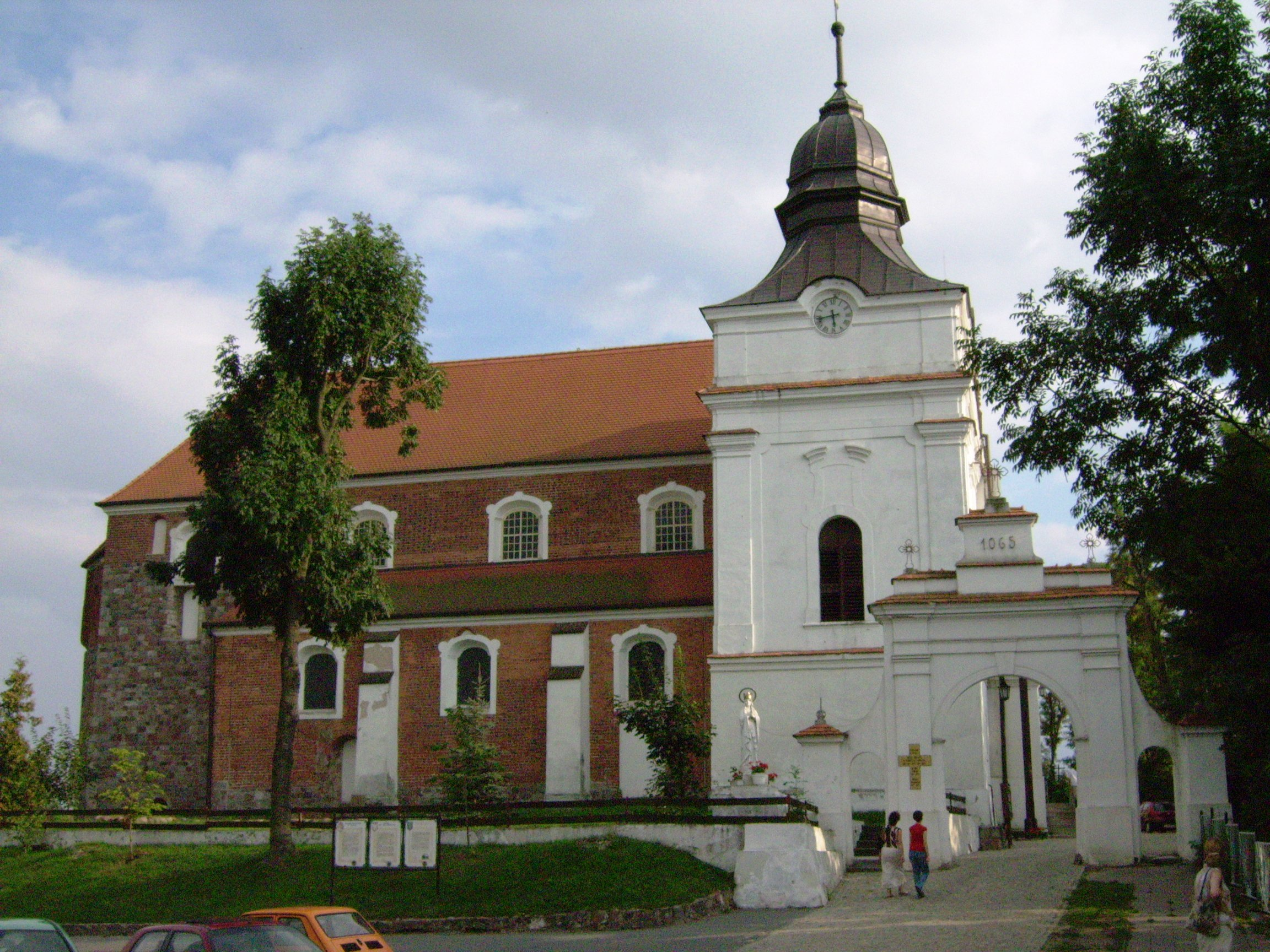
Saint John the Evangelist church

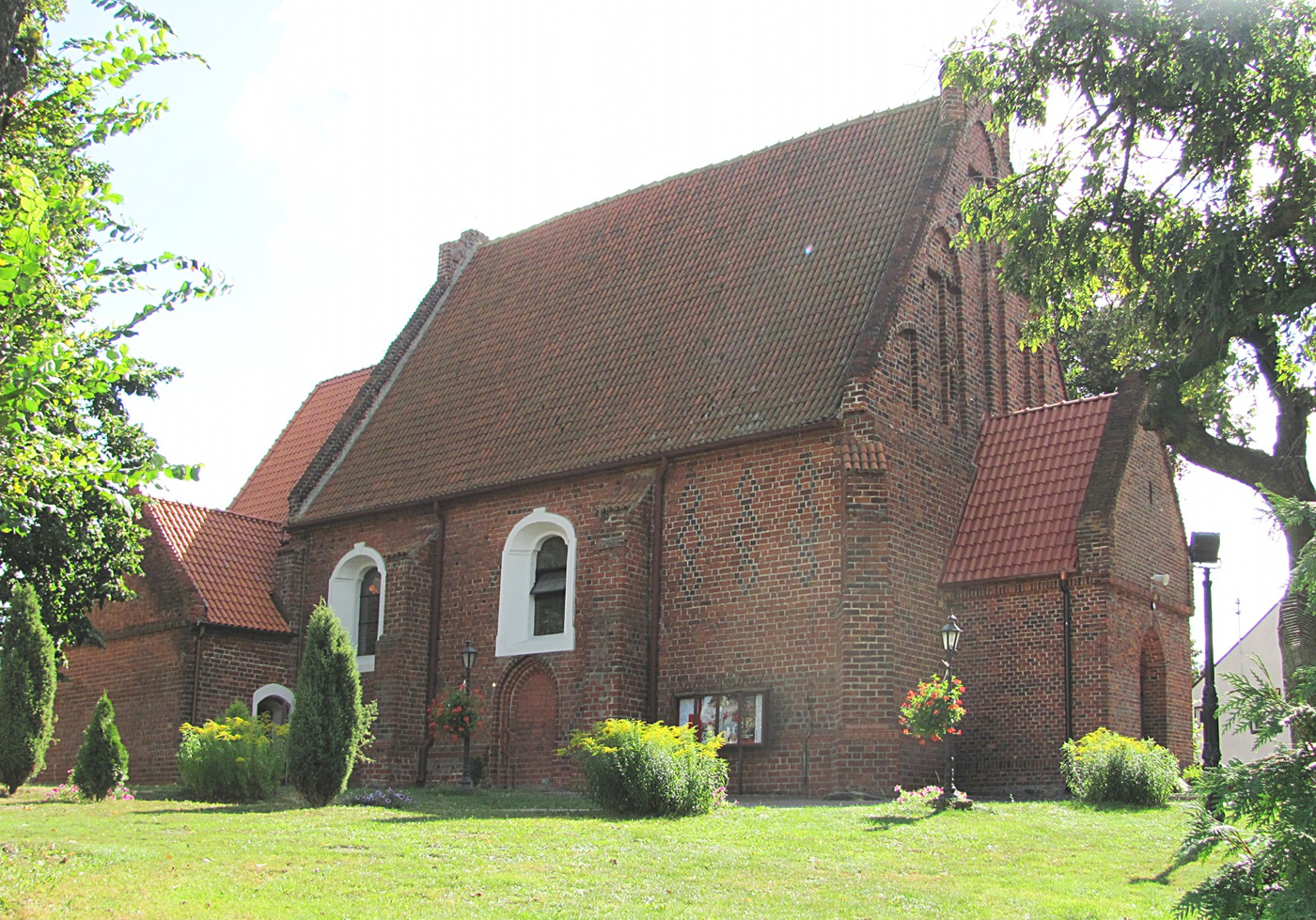
Saint James church

- The former Benedictine abbey; church dates back to 11th century, rebuilt in 13th and 1st half of 16th centuries in late-Gothic style, and also later in 2nd half of 18th century in late-Baroque. Facade is from end of 18th century. The church still retained many Romanesque parts, as pillars, parts of walls in the nave, and particularly well preserved are apse and two crypts. The three-winged abbey with garth dates from the 14th century, and was rebuilt in the 18th.
- Late-Gothic church of St. James dating back to ca. 1511
- Centre of the city with houses from 19th century
- Cemetery with a monument to Piotr Wawrzyniak (and a second monument to him at park)

== Culture and tourism ==
The town is home to the Mogilno Film Academy as well as a cinema. The film Voodoo Dad was set and shot entirely in the town.

There is a local museum dedicated to the local area, a local cultural institute, and several organisations dedicated to cultural activities and local venues.

It is also a focal point of many tourist trails and nature walks, most notably the Piast Trail. The scenic location also attracts a number of tourists looking to relax in the nearby forests and lakes.

== Transport ==
Vovoideship road 254 bypasses Mogilno to the east.

Mogilno has a station on the important Poznań-Toruń railway line.

== Sport ==
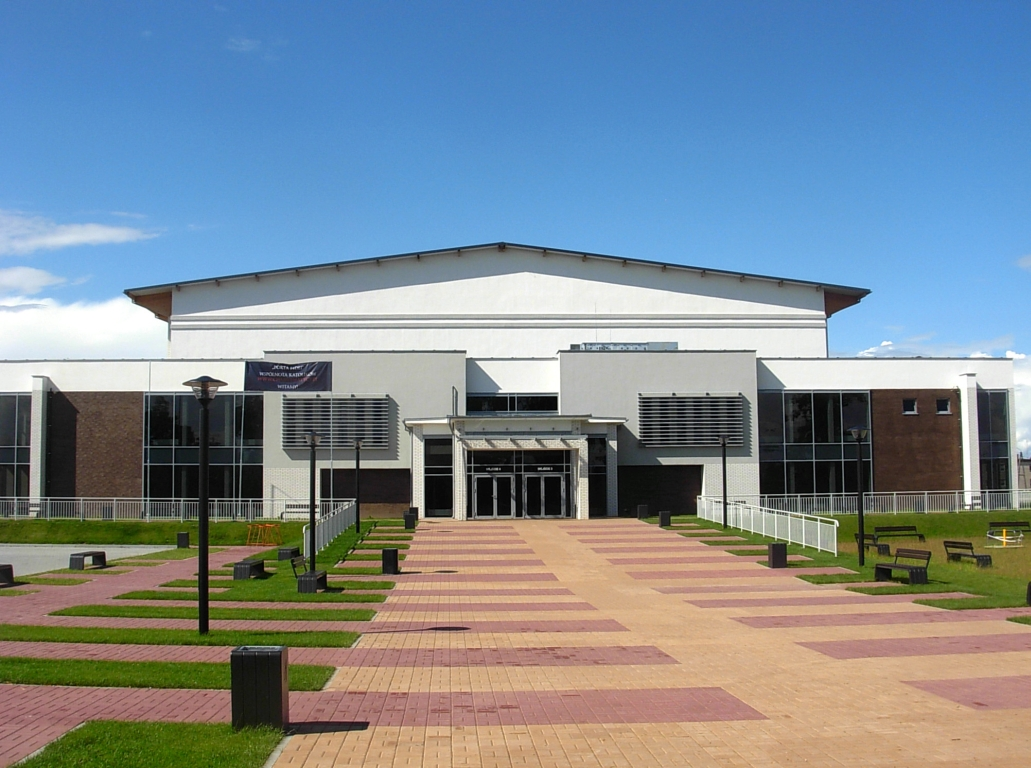
Sports hall

The local football team is Pogoń Mogilno.

== Twin towns ==
- Engelskirchen, Germany, since 2012
- Brody, Ukraine, since 2006
