= Telfa (Nokia Bydgoszcz) =

Telecommunication company, 1927, Bydgoszcz, Poland

Coordinates: 53°08′01″N 18°07′41″E

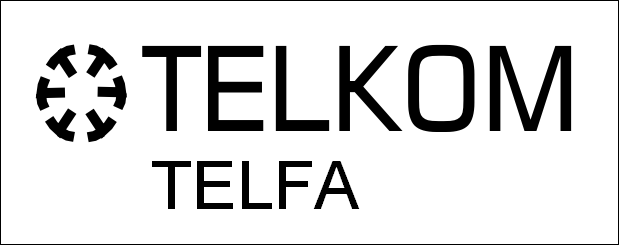
- Telkom-Telfa logo

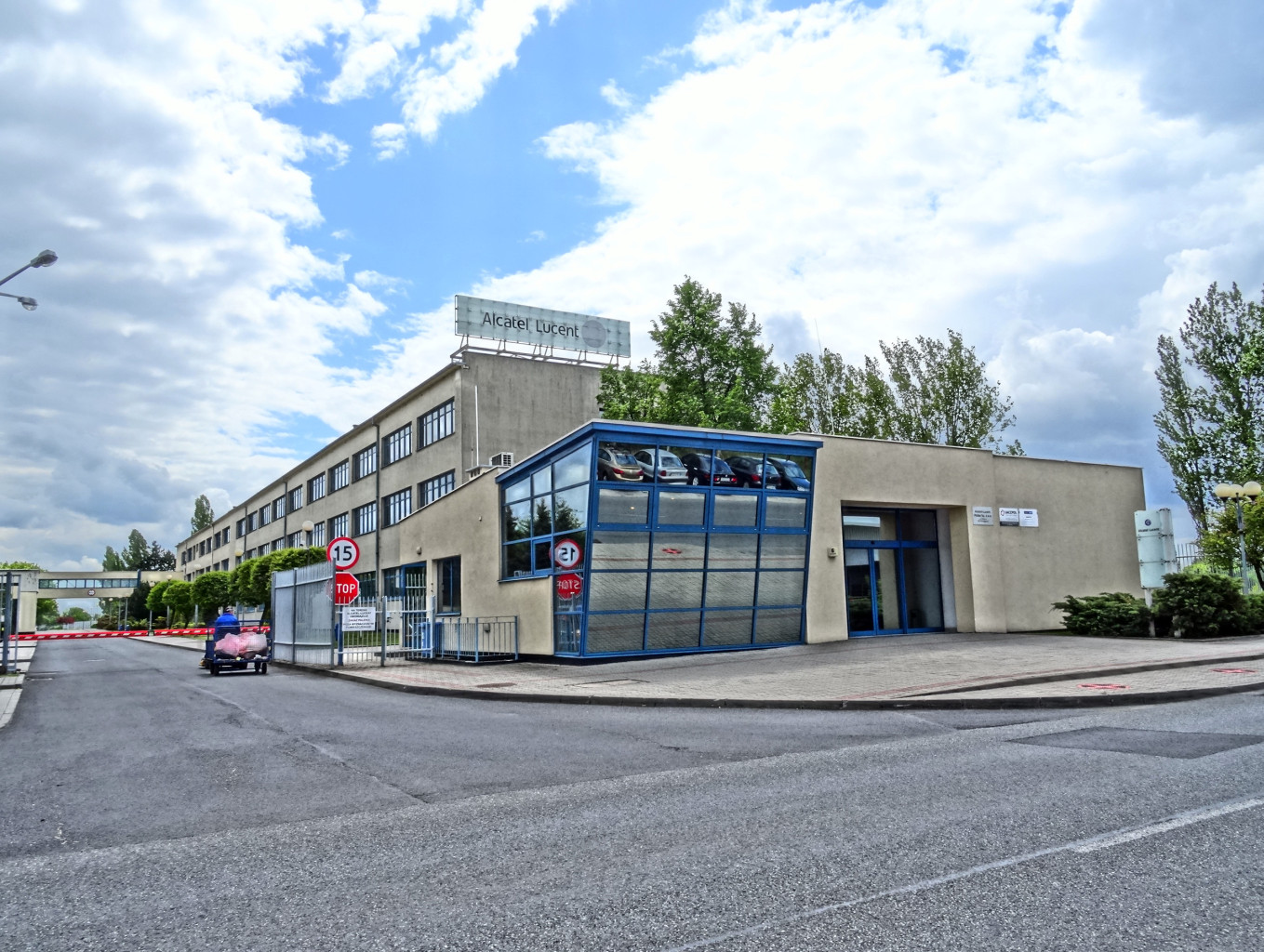
- Bydgoszcz premises - main entrance
- Company type: Private limited company
- Industry: Telecommunications industry
- Predecessor: Warsztaty Precyzyjne-Mechaniczne i Optyczne
- Founded: 1927; 98 years ago in Bydgoszcz, Poland
- Founder: Stanisław Krzemień, Zofia and Armand Paszka
- Successor: Nokia Bydgoszcz
- Headquarters: Bydgoszcz, Poland
- Products: R&D, Global Services, Professional Services
- Owner: Nokia
- Number of employees: c. 1000
- Parent: Nokia
- Website: nokiabydgoszcz.pl

Telfa (Nokia-Bydgoszcz) is a Polish telecommunications company founded in 1927, it is one of the oldest existing telecommunications industry factories in Poland.

During Soviet time, it was known as Zakłady Teleelektroniczne Telkom-Telfa. In 1992, it became part of the AT&T holding and later a subsidiary of Lucent Technologies, renamed in 2006 Alcatel-Lucent group. Since 2016, the firm has been controlled by Nokia.

The Bydgoszcz site includes a research and development center from Bell Labs, one of the world leading R&D company.

== History ==
=== Interwar period ===
On 1 October 1927, Stanisław Krzemień, Zofia and Armand Paszka founded the Warsztaty Precyzyjne-Mechaniczne i Optyczne (Precision-Mechanical and Optical Workshops) in Bydgoszcz. It was located at then 12 Chrobrego Street (present day 21).

While the Paszka were responsible for formal matters related to contracts with clients and office management, Stanisław Krzymień was the master of precision mechanics: he gained professional experience in German enterprises such as Carl Zeiss AG, Optische Anstalt C. P. Goerz, Otto Tropfer and Askania Werke. The growth of the company went alongside the rapid development of the technical industry in Poland, thanks to the progress of electrification and telephony.

At that time, unlike other telecommunication firms in the country, the share capital of Warsztaty Precyzyjno-Mechaniczne i Optyczne was entirely under Polish control. Between 1935 and 1939, the production hall was expanded so that about 60 workers could work at the same time in one shift. Machine tools were purchased in Weimar Germany and were regularly modernized. The incoming materials (celluloid, gum, ebonite, porcelain insulators) were initially imported from Germany and were later acquired directly from Polish factories.

Initially, the workshop undertook repairs and renovations of precision-mechanical and optical devices. Progressively, the panel of fixing services widened:

- leveling devices, theodolites, measuring and drawing instruments;
- geodetics instruments, compasses, sextants, octantss;
- telescopes, magnifying glasses, binoculars and protractors;
- surgical equipment and medical microscopes;
- office typewriters;
- telephones and telegraphy devices.

In 1930, most of the customers came from national organisms, i.e. repairs on measuring instruments for the Armed Forces, the State Railways and the State Forest directorates of Bydgoszcz and Toruń. In addition to services, the company also produced spare parts for radiators and telecommunication equipment, mainly for the Polish Post service, railway entities and foreign companies (e.g. Ericsson). In those days (1930s), the Bydgoszcz factory was in competition with the Państwowe Zakłady Tele- i Radiotechniczne (State Tele- and Radio-technical Works) in Warsaw: only these enterprises were capable to produce large quantity of spare parts for telephony and telegraphy.

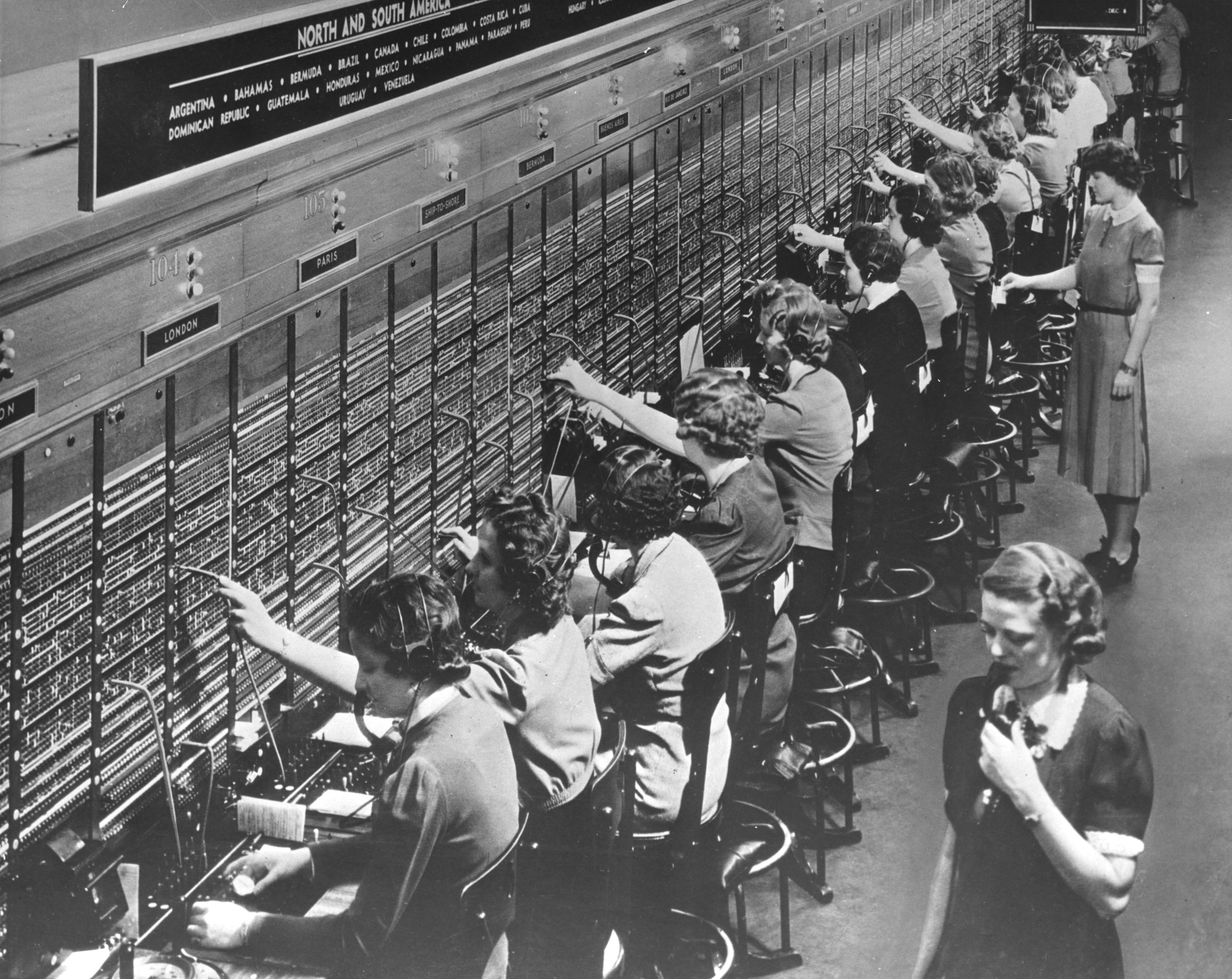
Women Working at a Bell System Telephone Switchboard (1930s)

In 1929, in order to start manufacturing components for manual switchboards and telephone switches, a partnership was established with Bydgoszcz-based Bydgoszcz Cable Factory and Bydgoszcz Fabryka Signalów, the Ministry of Posts and Telegraphs and the Zachodnio-Polska Budowa Telefonów from Katowice. The joint venture could sell its products to the post office directorates of southern and central Poland.

While the initial yield was focused on spare parts for telecommunications devices, the production of complete telephone switchboards (with a capacity up to 100 numbers) and telegraph Morse code systems began in 1935. In particular, the Bydgoszcz firm provided components for the installation of cable telegraphy between Warsaw, Katowice and Kraków in 1936.

In 1928, telephone and telegraphy parts represented 80% of the total output but two years later the majority of the manufacturing (63%) revolved around telephone switchboards.

In 1936, the company received two gold medals for High quality and Aesthetics of sockets and toggle switches at the Wystawa Przemysłu Metalowego I Elektrotechnicznego (Metal and Electrical Engineering Exhibition) in Warsaw. In 1939, the company employed 45 people.

=== Second World War ===
During the occupation, the firm was taken over by German forces but kept its range of production. In 1943, it was incorporated into the Helmut Kühnke company.

=== Polish People's Republic (1946–1989) ===
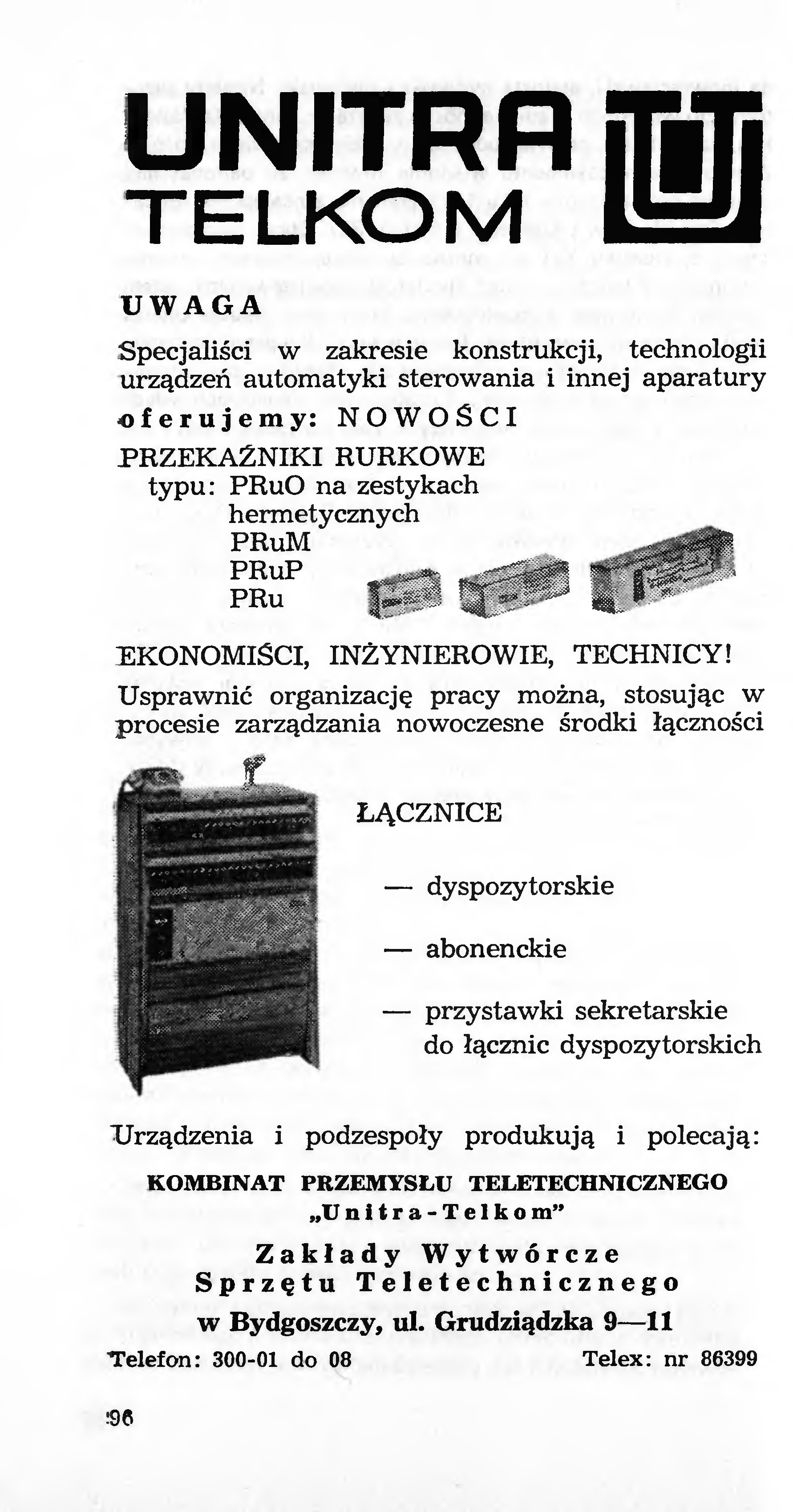
Advertising for Unitra-Telkom in 1972

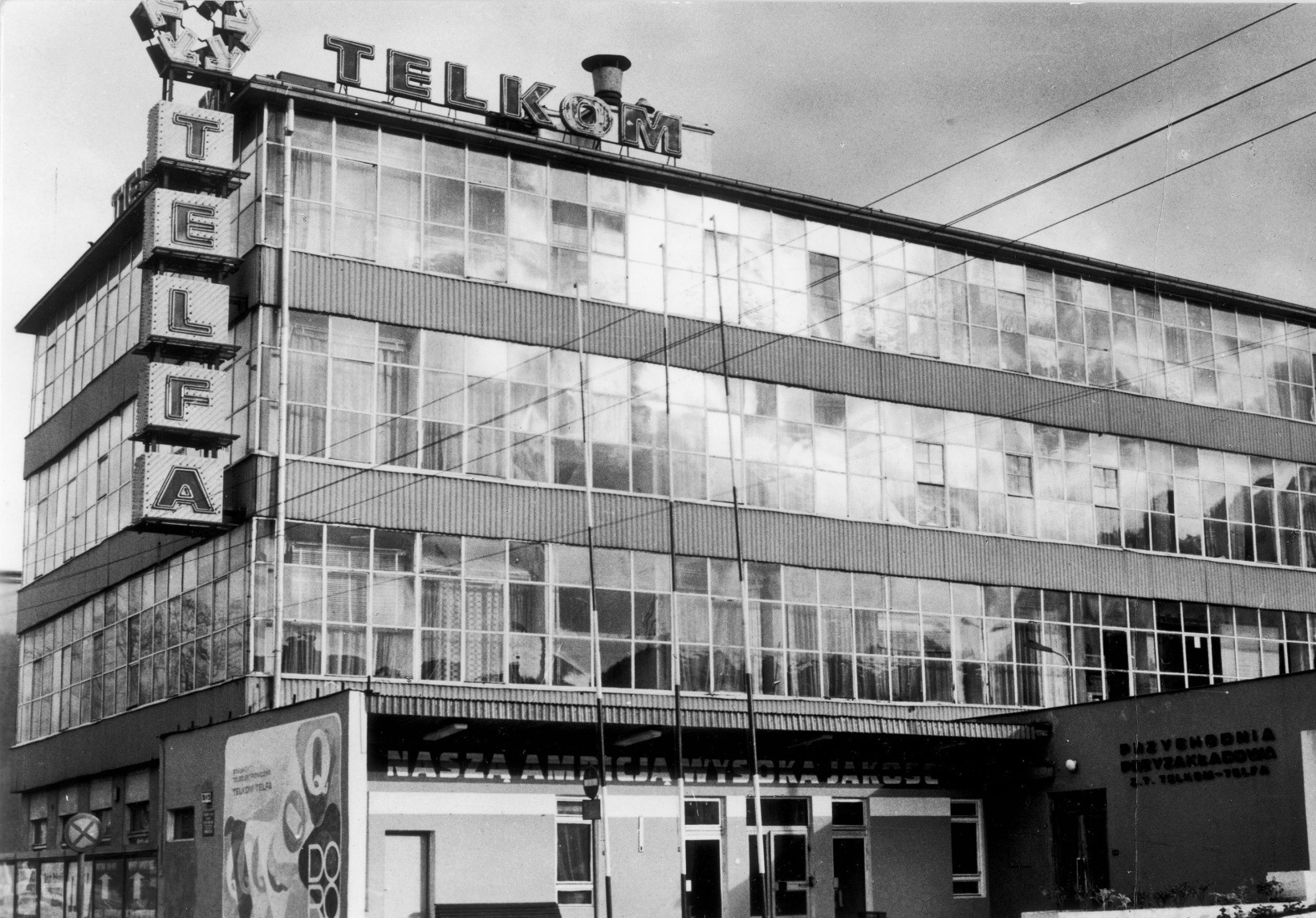
TELKOM facilies at Pilicka street, 1975

After World War II, the plant came under state management. In 1947, it was transferred from Chrobrego Street to 9-11 Grudziadzka Street and was nationalized on 28 November 1949. The number of employees quickly boomed, from 194 at the beginning of 1948 to 620 people, including 220 women in 1954. In the 1950s, the plant moved under the supervision of the Unitra (Union of Electronic and Teletechnical Industry), changing its name to Telfa first and to Telkom-Telfa in 1971.

=== 1960s ===
By 1960, the old factory buildings were replaced with new office and production facilities. The number of employees increased again to 1719 in 1972 and the production during this period increased 16-fold Between 1960 and 1975, the machinery park was modernized but the production halls were not expanded.

Until 1955, mostly manual telephone switchboards were produced. The catalogue later expanded to include automatic switchboards, fire alarm and anti-burglary devices, mining signaling and industrial dispatch devices, relays or rectifiers. In the late 1960s, a cooperation with the Institute of Chemistry of the University in Toruń allowed the development of a patented technology about anti-corrosion coatings for telecommunications connectors.

=== 1970s ===
In 1970, the plant was a leading manufacturer of telecommunication components and the only manufacturer of dispatch devices in Poland The staff comprised graduates of the Telecommunications Department of the Bydgoszcz Higher School of Engineering recently opened in 1961. In 1973, a branch department for thermoprocessing plastics was established in Mrocza. In parallel, social structures were developed for the benefit of the employees: a clinic, a sport club and a recreation center in Przyjezierze.

The plant's output was usually realized upon reception of specific orders, making each products unique. The communist planned economy did not allow any quality testing or technical research and the products had often low standards.

Exports have been launched in 1967, mainly towards socialist countries, i.e. 20 other countries from Europe, Asia and Africa. In the 1970s, Telkom-Telfa was one of the fastest growing industrial plants in Bydgoszcz, as a result of the specific exports to Soviet Union which increased regularly every year. This tendency called for the expansion of the factory, which began in 1973 and was completed on 31 March 1976, with the opening of new facilities in the Brdyujście district, near the ROMET Bicycle Plant. These additional buildings were housing the mechanical and galvanizing departments, and doubled the area of production. During the 1970s, the production increased 4.5-fold and the exports 20-fold.

=== 1980s ===
By 1980, the employment had again increased to reach 2500 people, attracting, among others, the residents of the new district of Fordon. On 18 August 1980, the Telfa staff were the first among the Bydgoszcz factories personnel to go on strike as part of the events of August 1980. The demands of the strikers included a better supply of meat products, the raise of family benefits to the level of those received by the army and militia, free trade unions and the end of censorship. After a number of promises from Wincenty Domisz, then president of Bydgoszcz, the strike ended on the same day.

In that period, Telfa manufacturing extends to dispatch and loudspeaker devices, security alarms, components for telecommunication and control engineering. The company kept on cooperating with scientific units centres: Bydgoszcz University of Technology and Agriculture, Warsaw University of Technology, Gdańsk University of Technology, Warsaw Institute of Communications, Toruń University, Warsaw Institute of Precision Mechanics, Gliwice Institute of Welding and the Łukasiewicz Research Network - Institute of Precision Mechanics in Warsaw.

In the 1980s, 60% of the production was exported and the factory was one of the leading exporters of the Bydgoszcz Voivodeship. During various fairs and exhibitions, Telfa harvested 7 gold medals.

=== Modern period (1989-present day) ===
During the period of economic transformation in Poland after 1989, the export of Telkom-Telfa products towards USSR soon collapsed, threatening the economic viability of the enterprise. In this dire situation, the firm was selected for immediate privatization, along with four others:

- Telkom-Teletra in Poznań and State Teletransmission Plants taken over by Alcatel Spain;
- Teletechnical Equipment Manufacturing Plants in Warsaw and Elwro Wrocław purchased by Siemens.

With this move, Bydgoszcz had become the seat of the second largest AT&T centre in Europe, after the Netherlands.

On 16 November 1992, the American corporation AT&T, one of the world's leaders in telecommunications, purchased 80% of the shares of Telfa in Bydgoszcz, creating a bridgehead for its expansion in Central and Eastern Europe. AT&T carried out a thorough modernization of the plant, allocating in particular 70 million dollars to set up a modern computer laboratory, connected with its research facilities in Hilversum, Netherland and with the Bell Labs in the USA. Telfa acquired new staff from the Faculty of Telecommunications of the Bydgoszcz University of Science and Technology. The new AT&T's seat in Bydgoszcz also opened branches in Warsaw, Szczecin and Gdańsk.

The company switched to service and production activities (e.g. network construction and training services), and developed innovative activities in the domain of digital telephone exchanges and fire alarm systems. In the 1990s, a software department was set up, which gradually took over some of the tasks previously performed by the Bell Labs.

In 1995, AT&T group was broken up into three independent bodies: AT&T for telecommunications services (mainly on the American market), Lucent for telecommunications systems and technologies (including Bell Labs) and NCR Corporation for computer systems and professional devices. In the split, the Bydgoszcz company became part of the Lucent group, with the department located at Grudziądzka Street (software development department for 5ESS exchanges) under the stewardship of Bell Labs. In 1997, the company employed 1,183 people.

The site in Fordon was responsible for the domestic market and exportations to other company factories worldwide regarding telecommunications equipment, 5ESS system exchanges and material (cabling, metal and plastic parts for telecommunications systems). In parallel, investments were realized to renew the machinery park and the assembly and testing lines. As far as quality is concerned, Telfa was granted ISO 9002, ISO 9001 (1996) and ISO 14001 (1998) quality certificates for 5ESS exchanges. The Bell Laboratory in Bydgoszcz dealt with software for 5ESS exchanges for the entire world.

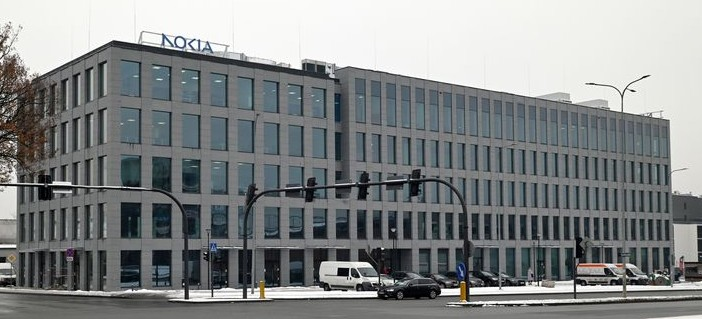
Nokia Bydgoszcz, Ogińskiego street new site, 2023

In 2001, the company decided to concentrate its operations in Fordon (Pilicka street) and sold the site at Grudziądzka street to the city, which moved there most of the City Hall departments.

In 2006, following the merger of Alcatel and Lucent Technologies, a global company Alcatel-Lucent was established, headquartered in Paris. In 2007, the branch Alcatel Lucent Polska was established, seated in Warsaw, with a branch in Bydgoszcz: in 2010, it hired 100 engineers in connection with the expansion of the Global Network Management Center. At that time, Alcatel-Lucent Bydgoszcz employed 700 people.

In January 2016, Alcatel-Lucent merged with Nokia, which became the new owner of the Bydgoszcz factory.

In December 2023, Nokia Bydgoszcz opened its new headquarters in a modern office and residential complex erected between Ogińskiego and Chopina streets.

== Name ==
- 1927–1931 – Warsztaty Precyzyjno-Mechaniczne i Optyczne, Precision-Mechanical and Optical Workshops;
- 1931–1939 – Zakłady i Warsztaty Precyzyjno-Mechaniczne i Optyczne Krzymień i Paszkę, Precision-Mechanical and Optical Plants and Workshops Krzymień and Paszki;
- 1939–1943 – Zakłady i Warsztaty Precyzyjno-Mechaniczne i Optyczne pod powierniczym zarządem niemieckim, Precision-Mechanical and Optical Plants and Workshops under German trusteeship;
- 1943–1945 – filia zakładu Helmut Kühnke A.G, branch of the Helmut Kühnke A.G. plant;
- 1945–1948 – Zakłady i Warsztaty Precyzyjno-Mechaniczne i Optyczne pod zarządem państwowym, Precision-Mechanical and Optical Plants and Workshops under state management;
- 1948–1950 – Fabryka Central Telefonicznych, Telephone Exchange Factory;
- 1950–1959 – Zakłady Wytwórcze Sprzętu Teletechnicznego-zakład T8 w Bydgoszczy, Telecommunication Equipment Manufacturing Plants-T8 plant in Bydgoszcz;
- 1959–1974 – Zakłady Wytwórcze Sprzętu Teletechnicznego Telfa, Telfa Telecommunication Equipment Manufacturing Plants;
- 1974–1982 – Zakłady Teleelektroniczne Telkom-Telfa w Bydgoszczy, Telkom-Telfa Teleelectronic Plants in Bydgoszcz;
- 1982–1992 – Zakłady Teleelektroniczne Telfa w Bydgoszczy, Telfa Teleelectronic Plants in Bydgoszcz;
- 1992–1995 – AT&T Telfa S.A.;
- 1995–2006 – Lucent Technologies Network Systems Poland S.A, Lucent Technologies Network Systems Poland S.A.;
- 2006–2016 – Alcatel-Lucent Polska Sp. z o.o., Alcatel-Lucent Polska Sp. z o.o.;
- Since 2016 – Nokia.

== Characteristics ==
The current factory - called Technology Centre, is part of the Nokia corporation, a manufacturer of telecommunications solutions. In 2024, it employed about 1000 people in Bydgoszcz in the following main departments:

- Research and Development - Application for Global services, offering R&D Nokia Cloud & Network Services a stable environment for cloud systems based on different versions of Band Infrastructure Software;
- Centre for Design and Integration of IP and Optical Systems;
- Global Centre for Design, Integration and Transformation of Fixed Network;
- Fixed Network Projects;
- Professional Services - Technical Customer Support Department, providing services for telecommunications operators within virtual international teams, with remote access to laboratories located around the world;
- Industrial Center (ICC) Factory departments, dealing with the integration and testing of telecommunications systems manufactured for specific orders.

== See also ==
- Bydgoszcz
- Alcatel-Lucent
- Nokia
- Bell Labs

== Bibliography ==
- Kornet, Dorota (1998). Przemysł elektrotechniczny w Bydgoszczy w latach 1920–1939 (cz. 2), Kronika Bydgoska XIX [The electrical industry in Bydgoszcz in the years 1920–1939 (part 2), Kronika Bydgoszcz XIX] (in Polish). Bydgoszcz: Towarzystwo Miłosnikow Miasta Bydgoszczy - Bydgoskie Towarzystwo Naukowe. pp. 60–74.
