= AQAP =

AQAP may refer to:

- Al-Qaeda in the Arabian Peninsula, a militant Islamist group
- Allied Quality Assurance Publications, standards for quality assurance systems that have been developed by NATO
