= BELMA =

Electromechanical company, 1868, Bydgoszcz, Poland

Coordinates: 53°07′17″N 17°54′03″E

Bydgoskie Zakłady Elektromechaniczne "Belma" S.A.
- Belma logo
- Type: State-owned company
- Industry: Land mines
- Founded: 1868 in Bydgoszcz, Poland
- Headquarters: Białe Błota, Poland
- Key people: Artur Łysakowski
- Products: land mines, mine detectors
- Owner: Polish State
- Parent: Polish Armaments Group
- Website: belma.pl

BELMA is a Polish defence company located in Białe Błota, in the vicinity of Bydgoszcz. It is one of the oldest industrial plants in Poland. Belma's business began in 1868 as a locksmith company. Its primary responsibility today is the production and design of land mines for the Polish Army. BELMA is the only manufacturer of anti-tank mines in Poland.

Since 2010, BELMA has been a member of Division Ammunition of the Polish Armaments Group-Polska Grupa Zbrojeniowa (PGZ SA).

== History ==
=== Prussian times ===
The beginnings of the company date back to 1868, when Carl Fiebrandt established a locksmith's workshop in Bromberg (as Bydgoszcz was called) at then "4 Bahnhoffstraße" (today's 11 Dworcowa Street).

Initially, Fiebrandt's workshop dealt with the repair and production of agricultural machinery but expanded in the 1870s to the manufacturing of safety devices for railway traffic. In 1875, the factory moved to the suburban village of Okole (now a district of Bydgoszcz), at today's 30 Grunwaldzka Street. The entity became in 1898 a Limited Liability Company, one of the shareholders being the enterprise "Siemens & Halske".

Carl Fiebrandt handled alone the company until 1901, when he established a management led by two building advisors, Baum and Bothe. Carl Fiebrandt died on June 15, 1912.

Thanks to its licences, the firm produced setting devices and line blockades for the state railways throughout the German Empire. It was the first large enterprise in Bromberg (Bydgoszcz) in the electrotechnical and engineering business, then employing about 150 people.

=== Interwar ===
During the interwar period, the company funding was still based on German capital, but was the largest in its domain in Poland.

In 1923, it was purchased by "Polskie Zakłady Siemens" in Warsaw, which became the only manufacturer of railway signaling and safety equipment in the country.

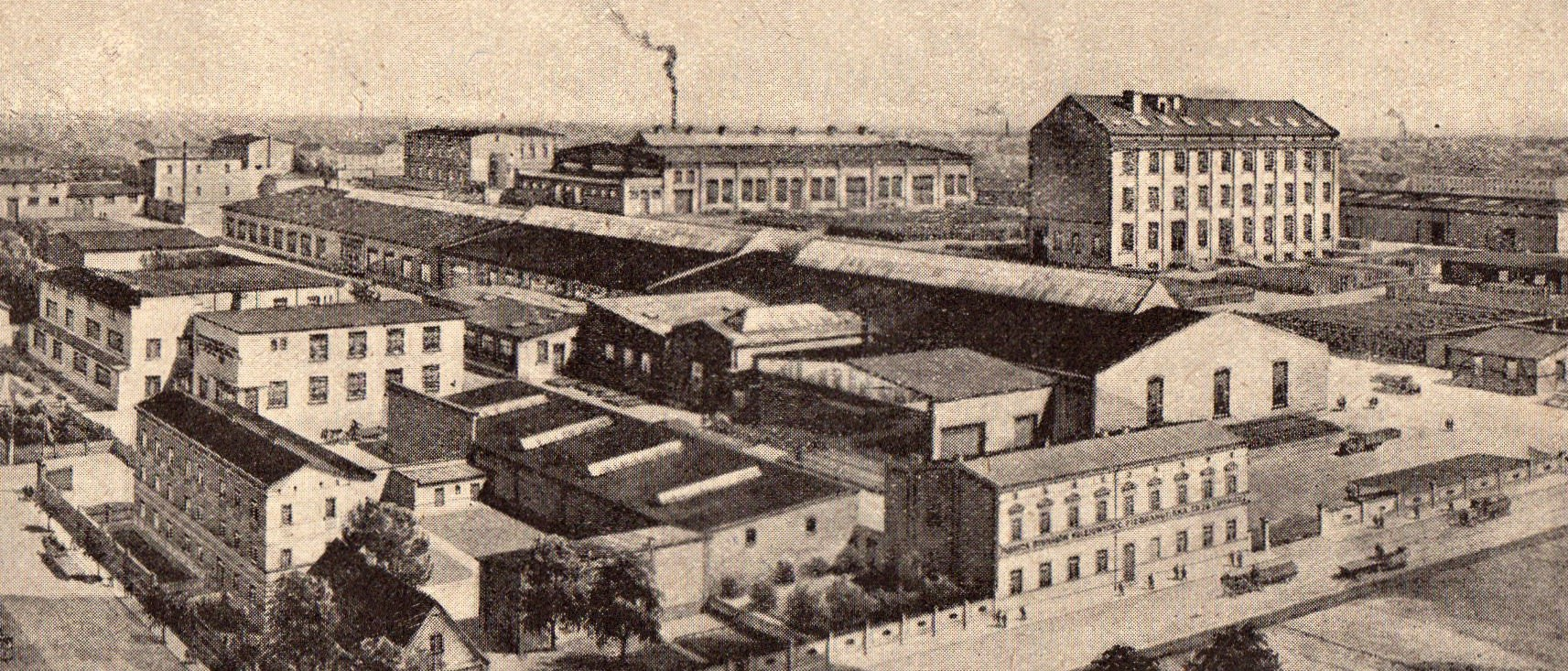
Carl Fiebrandt factory in Bydgoszcz ca 1930

The production mostly relied on licenses from two companies: Siemens and "Vereinigte Eisenbahn-Signalwerke" from Berlin.

In the years 1924–1925, on the initiative of the Ministry of Communications, the factory was significantly expanded and equipped with the newest machines. In the 1920s, the plant employed about 500 workers and 100 managers; this number dropped dramatically during the Great Depression, with 222 laid off personnel in 1929. In addition, the German origin of the capital made the firm banned in 1932 from receiving any orders by the state railway. As a consequence, the firm operated at only 10% of its capacity. As a mitigation measure, from 1935 to 1937, Polish authorities only agreed to use products of Bydgoszcz Fabryka Signalów if they were subcontracted by Kraków's Wytwórnia Signalów Kolejowych.

In mid-1939, following a reshuffling of the capital, 49% of the shares were purchased by the Swedish company AGA and 51% by the Polish company Elektra which was also managed by "AGA". Thereby, orders to PKP resumed, in particular with automatic level crossing signals. The company name was changed to Bydgoskie Zakłady Przemysłowe Spółka Akcyjna (English: Bydgoszcz Industrial Plant joint-stock company). The new entity increased the scope of its production panel to include lighting airports and ports devices and traffic light systems.

"Bydgoskie Zakłady Przemysłowe" (BZP) became the first company in its domain in Poland. On June 22, 1939, the Ministry of Communications allowed BZP to partner back directly with the "Polskie Koleje Państwowe", but the outbreak of the war prevented this decision to come into force.

=== Occupation of Poland (1939–1945) ===
During the German occupation, the factory at Grunwaldzka street employed about 450 employees. The Germans authorities dismantled the entire manufacture of electrical signals and transported it to Berlin and Vienna, while replacing a large part of the machine park in Bydgoszcz.

Main orders carried out were for the benefit of the army (e.g. warheads for grenades, equipment for bridge building).

In 1942, Siemens moved its "Department of electrical flameproof and explosion-proof device for mining" moved to Bydgoszcz. This decision allowed "BZP" to start handling the production of electrical switches for mines and airports.

=== PRL Period (1946–1989) ===
On January 30, 1945, 220 new employees were registered. The Soviet military authorities oriented the production towards tools for bridges repairing.

In April 1945, the plant's equipment was intended to be transported back to Soviet Union and the site was occupied by Red Army soldiers to that end. A crew mutiny on April 27 and the persistent intervention of Polish authorities led initially to an agreement on May 7, to move only 70 machines, leaving 116 of them in the factory. Eventually, another conciliation with a representative of the USSR Economic Mission in Warsaw, on May 22, reversed the decision, leaving all the factory assets untouched: the train with the first machines on its route to Soviet Union was then diverted back to Bydgoszcz in June 1945. The factory resumed work on June 7, 1945, but some of its departments were closed until October 1945. At the beginning of 1948, the "BZP" already employed 545 people.

The company was nationalized, with the production of train traffic safety devices continued and new manufacturing for the needs of the army started (e.g. fuses for anti-tank and hand grenades. In 1951, the plant was incorporated into the Central Management for Precision Products (Polish: Centralny zarząd Wyroby Precyjcyjne): with this exclusive move towards military production, the manufacture of railway signaling devices was abandoned and transferred to a site in Żory.

The Six-Year Plan having endorsed the extension of the plant, a site was identified in 1951-1954, in Białe Błota, south of Bydgoszcz, where was built a secondary factory. In this Bydgoska Fabryka Wyrobów Precyzyjnych (English: Bydgoszcz Factory of Precise Products), special orders for the army were carried out.

With a more relaxed international situation in 1954, military orders were scant: the plant adapted its production with civilian items, delivering, among others, electrical explosion-proof devices for mining and chemical industries, or capacitors and sound signal tools for the automotive industry.

On April 16, 1958, both producing sites (Bydgoscz and Białe Błota) were merged into Bydgoskie Zakłady Elektromechaniczne' (English: Bydgoszcz Electromechanical Works) Belma.

In 1959, a cultural and educational center (Polish: Dom Kultury) for the benefit of BELMA employees was opened at 50 Grunwaldzka street (today the edifice houses the Kuyavian-Pomeranian Tax Office in Bydgoszcz) and a vocational school started operating on the plant site. Similarly, in the 1960s-1970s, holiday and recreation centers for BELMA were built in several locations:

- Przyjezierze;
- Romanowo, near a lake;
- Kadzionka (a fishing center);
- Miłków, in the Lower Silesian Voivodeship (two holiday houses).

Workforce grew: 1,500 people in the 1960s and 2,000 in the 1970s. Civilian equipment was exported non only to socialist countries, but also to India and Spain.

In 1974, the company merged with Pomorski Zakłady Aparatury Elektrycznej'-"Apator", based in Toruń, the ensemble being managed by the Union of Electrical Machines and Apparatus-"Ema" (Polish: Zjednoczenie Maszyn i Aparatów Elektrycznych „Ema”).

In 1981, the alliance split up, with on one side "Apator" and on the other side the new firm named Bydgoskie Zakłady Elektro-Mechaniczne-"Ema-Belma" (English: Bydgoszcz Electro-Mechanical Works).

=== Recent period ===
In 1987, an expansion of the plant in Białe Błota began so as to meet the army requirements for special productions.

In 1989, Poland began a policy of steadfast economic liberalization which caused BELMA to enter a debt spiral. To end this crisis, a staunch recovery program was implemented: reduction of employment by half (down to 800 people), reduction of the then-generous social benefits, suspension of contributions to the Social Insurance Institution, suspension of investments. Furthermore, the scheme included massing the production in one site only (i.e. Białe Błota) and selling part of the assets (the cultural center in Bydgoszcz and holiday and recreation centers).

In 1992, the enterprise finally overcome its financial problems. On August 25, 1994, the plant was transformed into a joint-stock company and in 1995, a contract was signed with "Fiat Poland" for the supply of car horn systems. In 1998, sales were distributed as follows: about 30% for explosion-proof equipment, 30% for military production and 25% for export.

In 2009, 85% of the capital was owned by the group Bumar (purchased in 2011 by Mesko holding) and 15% by the employees. Since 2015, Mesko group has been a division of the holding Polish Armaments Group (Polish: Polska Grupa Zbrojeniowa- PGZ SA).

During the 2017 International Defence Industry Exhibition organised in Kielce, "Bydgoski Zakłady Elektromechaniczne "Belma" S.A." was awarded the Defender prize, for its "Controlled Anti-Tank and Anti-Transport Explosive Charge" Tulip, highlighting the product's originality, technical innovation and operational value.

In June 2018, BELMA celebrated its 150th anniversary.

== Name ==
- 1892–1899: "Eisenbahn-Signal-Bauanstalt" (English: Railway Signal Construction Company) C. Fiebrandt & Co.
- 1899–1923: "Eisenbahn-Signalbau-Anstalt C. Fiebrandt & Co, Gesellschaft mit beschränkter Haftung in Schleusenau" (English: Railway Signal Construction Establishment, Limited liability company in Schleusenau)
- 1923–1939: Bromberger Eisenbahnsignalwerk vorm Fiebrandt AG – Bydgoska Fabryka Sygnałów Kolejowych C. Fiebrandt S-ka z o.o. (English: Bydgoszcz railway signalling)
- 1939–1943: The factory was incorporated into the SIEMENS concern,
- 1948–1958: Bydgoska Fabryka Sygnałów Kolejowych, Przedsiębiorstwo Państwowe Wyodrębnione (English: Bydgoszcz Railway Signals Factory, Independent State Enterprise)
- 1958–1974: Bydgoskie Zakłady Elektromechaniczne „Belma” (English: Bydgoszcz Electromechanical Works "Belma")
- 1974–1981: Branch of Pomeranian Electrical Apparatus Works "Ema-Apator" in Toruń
- 1981–1994: Bydgoskie Zakłady Elektro-Mechaniczne „Ema-Belma” (English: Bydgoszcz Electromechanical Works "Ema-Belma")
- od 1994: Bydgoskie Zakłady Elektromechaniczne „Belma” S.A. (English: Bydgoszcz Electromechanical Works "Belma" S.A.)

== Products ==
The company mainly deals with military production of:

- anti-tank mines;
- fuzes;
- mine throwers;
- mine detectors;
- tactical heads for UAVs.

Civil production covers explosion-proof items:

- home appliances for mining;
- equipment for the chemical industry;
- devices for the shipbuilding industry.

Lastly, BELMA offers services for the industry (metalworking, plastics processing, galvanisation), as well as testing and measuring capabilities.

The company has been certified according to the following standards: ISO 9001 (2015), NATO AQAP 2110 (2016) and Military University of Technology Nr 487 (2021).

== See also ==
- Bydgoszcz
- Białe Błota, Bydgoszcz County
- Polish Armaments Group

== Bibliography ==
- Derenda, Jerzy (1996). W "Belmie" trudności można pokonać! Kalendarz Bydgoski [Difficulties can be overcome in "Belma"! Bydgoszcz Calendar] (in Polish). Bydgoszcz: Towarzystwo Miłośników Miasta Bydgoszczy. pp. 68–72.
- Hutnik, Mieczysław; Pachniewicz, Tadeusz (1994). Zarys historii polskiego przemysłu elektronicznego do 1985 r., SEP, Zeszyt Historyczny nr 2 [An outline of the history of the Polish electronics industry until 1985, SEP, Historical Journal No. 2.] (in Polish). Warszawa: N-T.
