= Kuśnierz (village) =

- Village
- Location within Poland
- Coordinates: 52°32′N 18°14′E
- Country: Poland
- Voivodeship: Kuyavian-Pomeranian
- County: Mogilno
- Gmina: Jeziora Wielkie

Kuśnierz [ˈkuɕɲɛʂ] is a village in the administrative district of Gmina Jeziora Wielkie, within Mogilno County, Kuyavian-Pomeranian Voivodeship, in north-central Poland.
