= Siemionki, Kuyavian-Pomeranian Voivodeship =

Siemionki
- Village
- Location within Poland
- Coordinates: 52°35′12″N 18°19′16″E
- Country: Poland
- Voivodeship: Kuyavian-Pomeranian
- County: Mogilno
- Gmina: Jeziora Wielkie

Siemionki [ɕɛˈmjɔŋki] is a village in the administrative district of Gmina Jeziora Wielkie, within Mogilno County, Kuyavian-Pomeranian Voivodeship, in north-central Poland.
