= Włostowo, Kuyavian-Pomeranian Voivodeship =

Włostowo
- Village
- Location within Poland
- Coordinates: 52°35′N 18°19′E
- Country: Poland
- Voivodeship: Kuyavian-Pomeranian
- County: Mogilno
- Gmina: Jeziora Wielkie

Włostowo [vwɔsˈtɔvɔ] is a village in the administrative district of Gmina Jeziora Wielkie, within Mogilno County, Kuyavian-Pomeranian Voivodeship, in north-central Poland.
