= John Mojecki =

John Mojecki (November 12, 1865 – December 30, 1951) was a Polish-American businessman and community activist who emigrated to the United States in 1883. Born in Kożuszkowo, Poland, his first place of residence was Mauch Chunk, Pennsylvania (now known as Jim Thorpe). In 1888 he settled on Staten Island. Mojecki was known as a person with a kind heart, who did a lot for the other Polish emigrants who settled on Staten Island. He had several businesses like butchering, mercantile and home building. He became well respected for building St. Adelbert's Roman Catholic Church. Despite coming to the U.S. with few means, he achieved great success not only as a businessman, but also as a humanitarian and leader of people. Mojecki was one of the organizers of the Polish Democratic Club and was its president for 19 years. Due to the world depression beginning in 1929, his businesses failed and he had to start over again.

He died on December 30, 1951, in New York City.

== Sources ==
- https://web.archive.org/web/20070630012722/http://www.cny.org/archive/ft/ft071901.htm
