= Pomiany, Mogilno County =

Pomiany
- Village
- Location within Poland
- Coordinates: 52°32′19″N 18°12′30″E
- Country: Poland
- Voivodeship: Kuyavian-Pomeranian
- County: Mogilno
- Gmina: Jeziora Wielkie
- Population: 60

Pomiany [pɔˈmjanɨ] is a village in the administrative district of Gmina Jeziora Wielkie, within Mogilno County, Kuyavian-Pomeranian Voivodeship, in north-central Poland.
