= Wysoki Most, Kuyavian-Pomeranian Voivodeship =

Wysoki Most
- Village
- Location within Poland
- Coordinates: 52°30′25″N 18°8′4″E
- Country: Poland
- Voivodeship: Kuyavian-Pomeranian
- County: Mogilno
- Gmina: Jeziora Wielkie

Wysoki Most [vɨˈsɔki ˈmɔst] is a village in the administrative district of Gmina Jeziora Wielkie, within Mogilno County, Kuyavian-Pomeranian Voivodeship, in north-central Poland.
