= Polska Grupa Zbrojeniowa =

Polish defence company

Polska Grupa Zbrojeniowa SA
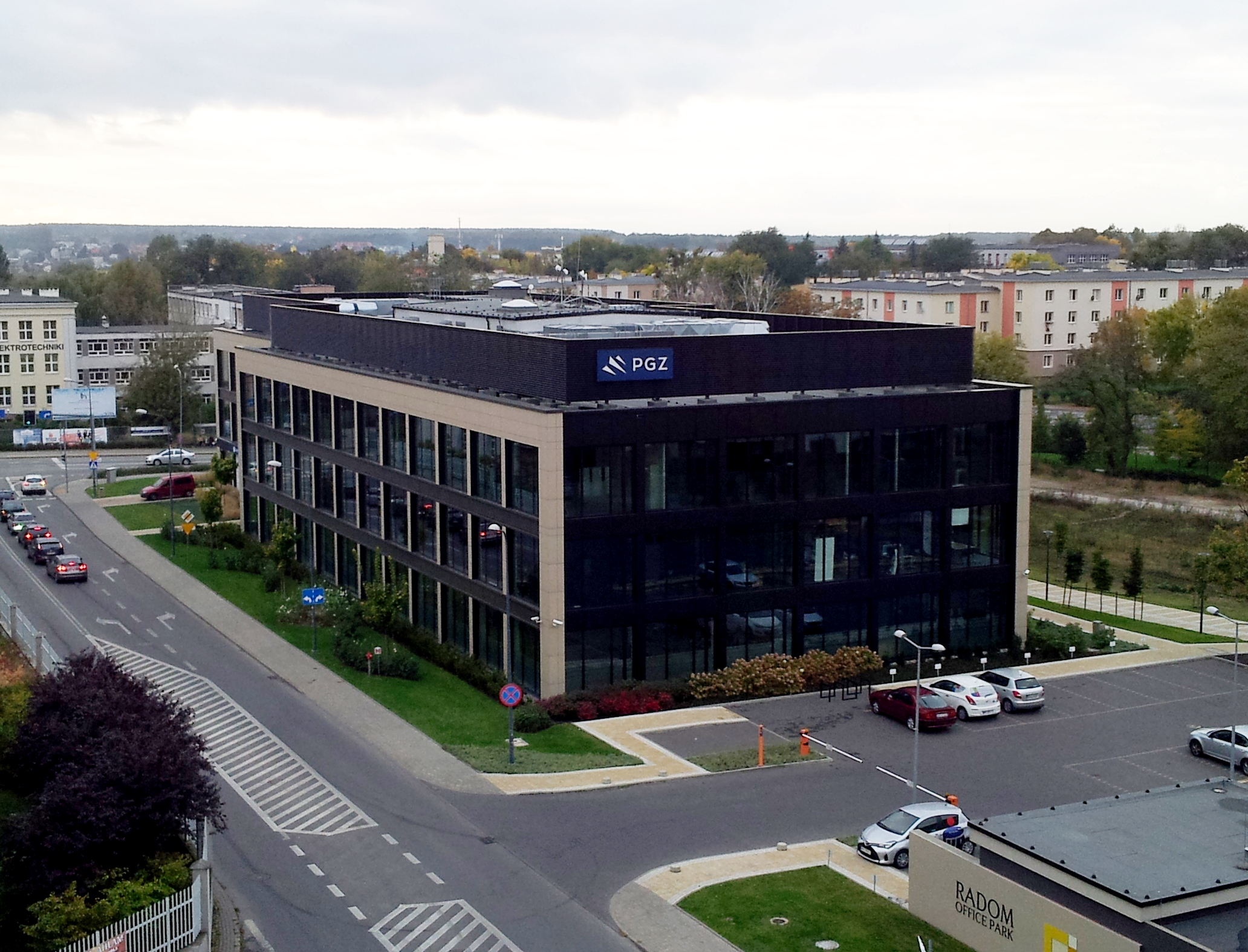
- Headquarters building in Radom
- Company type: Joint stock company
- Industry: Defence
- Founded: 2013
- Headquarters: Radom, Poland
- Key people: Adam Leszkiewicz (President of the Management Board); Artur Kołosowski (Chair of the Supervisory Board)
- Products: Military vehicles; Artillery equipment; Firearms; MANPADS; Ammunition; Aircraft GSE; Simulators; Training devices; Engineering equipment
- Revenue: US$1.44 billion (2023)
- Net income: 8,700,000 euro (2018)
- Number of employees: 20,000 (2016)
- Website: grupapgz.pl/en

The Polska Grupa Zbrojeniowa (lit. 'Polish Armaments Group') or PGZ SA is a holding company established by the Polish government in 2013 to unite Polish state-owned defence industry companies. Headquartered in Radom, the group is Poland's largest and one of Europe's major arms manufacturers comprising over 50 subsidiaries.

In 2024, PGZ was ranked 51st on the list of 100 largest arms companies in the world in terms of revenue, published by SIPRI.

== History ==
The conglomerate was founded in 2013. In 2015, the process of consolidation of the Polish state-owned arms manufacturers was completed when eight companies previously controlled by Polski Holding Obronny were acquired by the PGZ SA.

In 2024, PGZ SA signed a PLN11 billion (US$2.7 billion) contract with Poland's Ministry of National Defence to produce 300,000 155 mm artillery shells.

In July 2025, PGZ received an investment of €565 million from the state-owned Capital Investment Fund (FIK) to increase Polish ammunition production. Three new factories are to be built for this purpose, which will make Poland a center of European NATO arms production.

== Structure ==
The Group comprises over 50 companies and holds shares in 32 others active in defense, shipbuilding, new technologies industries.

Lead companies are divided into five domains: land, weapons & ammunition, C4ISR, air and naval.

=== Land domain ===
- H. Cegielski Poznań S.A.
- Zakłady Mechaniczne "Bumar-Łabędy" S.A.
- Huta Stalowa Wola S.A.
- Jelcz Sp. z o.o.
- Ośrodek Badawczo-Rozwojowy Urządzeń Mechanicznych "OBRUM" Sp. z o.o.
- Rosomak S.A.
- Stomil-Poznań S.A.
- Wojskowe Zakłady Motoryzacyjne S.A.
- Zakład Mechaniczny "Bumar-Mikulczyce" S.A.

=== Weapons & ammunition domain ===
- Bydgoskie Zakłady Elektromechaniczne "Belma" S.A.
- CENZIN Sp. z o.o.
- Zakłady Metalowe "DEZAMET" S.A.
- Fabryka Broni "Łucznik" - Radom Sp. z o.o.
- Zakłady Chemiczne "Nitro-Chem" S.A.
- Mesko S.A.
- Przedsiębiorstwo Sprzętu Ochronnego "Maskpol" S.A.
- PCO S.A.
- Wojskowe Zakłady Uzbrojenia S.A.
- Zakłady Mechaniczne "Tarnów" S.A.
- ZPS "Gamrat" Sp. z o.o.

=== C4ISR domain ===
- Ośrodek Badawczo-Rozwojowy Centrum Techniki Morskiej S.A.
- PIT-RADWAR S.A.
- Wojskowe Zakłady Elektroniczne S.A.
- Wojskowe Zakłady Łączności Nr 1 S.A.
- Wojskowe Zakłady Łączności Nr 2 S.A.
- ZURAD Sp. z o.o.

=== Air domain ===
- Wojskowe Centralne Biuro Konstrukcyjno-Technologiczne S.A.
- Wojskowe Zakłady Lotnicze Nr 1 S.A.
- Wojskowe Zakłady Lotnicze Nr 2 S.A.
- Wytwórnia Sprzętu Komunikacyjnego "PZL-Kalisz" S.A.

=== Naval domain ===
- PGZ Stocznia Wojenna Sp. z o.o.

== Central Military Bureau of Design and Technology ==
Wojskowe Centralne Biuro Konstrukcyjno-Technologiczne SA (WCBKT SA) (en. Central Military Bureau of Design and Technology) is a joint stock company formed on the basis of a state owned company, established in 1980 by the Polish Ministry of National Defence.

The company specialises in the design and manufacture of aircraft ground support equipment as well as simulators and armament training devices for tank and infantry fighting vehicle crews.

The Central Military Bureau of Design and Technology was established as a state enterprise on 1 January 1980.

The main objective of the Central Military Bureau of Design and Technology Joint Stock Company is to manufacture aircraft ground support equipment as well as training equipment, service and design.
