= Krzywe Kolano =

- Village
- Location within Poland
- Coordinates: 52°31′0″N 18°19′2″E
- Country: Poland
- Voivodeship: Kuyavian-Pomeranian
- County: Mogilno
- Gmina: Jeziora Wielkie

Krzywe Kolano [ˈkʂɨvɛ kɔˈlanɔ] (translation: Askew knee) is a village in the administrative district of Gmina Jeziora Wielkie, Mogilno County, Kuyavian-Pomeranian Voivodeship, Poland.
