= Kuśnierz =

Kuśnierz is a Polish occupational surname, meaning furrier. The surname has a large number of phonetical and orthographical variations: Kucznierz, Kuczmierz, Kuśnier, Kusznierz, Kusnierz, Kuszner, Kusznier, Kuśnirz, Kuśnir, Kusznirz, Kuszniż, Kucznierz, Kuśmierz, Kusmierz, Kuschmiesz, Kuśmirz, Kuśmir,Kusmirz, Kuźmierz, Kuczmierz, Kuśmiar, Kurśnierz, Kurśnirz, Kusniers, Kuschnierz, Kuschniers.

Archaic feminine forms: Kuśnierzowa (after husband), Kuśnierzówna (after father), Kuśnierka/Kuśnierzonka (colloquial).

See "Kürschner" for etymology. Notable people with the surname include:

- Bronisław Kuśnierz (1883–1966), Polish lawyer and politician, M.P.
- Robert Kuśnierz (born 1977) Polish historian, Sovietologist
