= Wola Kożuszkowa =

- Village
- Location within Poland
- Coordinates: 52°31′N 18°14′E
- Country: Poland
- Voivodeship: Kuyavian-Pomeranian
- County: Mogilno
- Gmina: Jeziora Wielkie
- Population (approx.): 400

Wola Kożuszkowa (German, 1939–1945 Wulldorf) [ˈvɔla kɔʐuʂˈkɔva] is a village in the administrative district of Gmina Jeziora Wielkie, within Mogilno County, Kuyavian-Pomeranian Voivodeship, in north-central Poland.

The village has an approximate population of 400.
