= Lenartowo =

- Village
- Location within Poland
- Coordinates: 52°30′N 18°16′E
- Country: Poland
- Voivodeship: Kuyavian-Pomeranian
- County: Mogilno
- Gmina: Jeziora Wielkie
- Population: 140

Lenartowo [lɛnarˈtɔvɔ] is a village in the administrative district of Gmina Jeziora Wielkie, within Mogilno County, Kuyavian-Pomeranian Voivodeship, in north-central Poland.
