= Nowa Wieś, Mogilno County =

Nowa Wieś
- Village
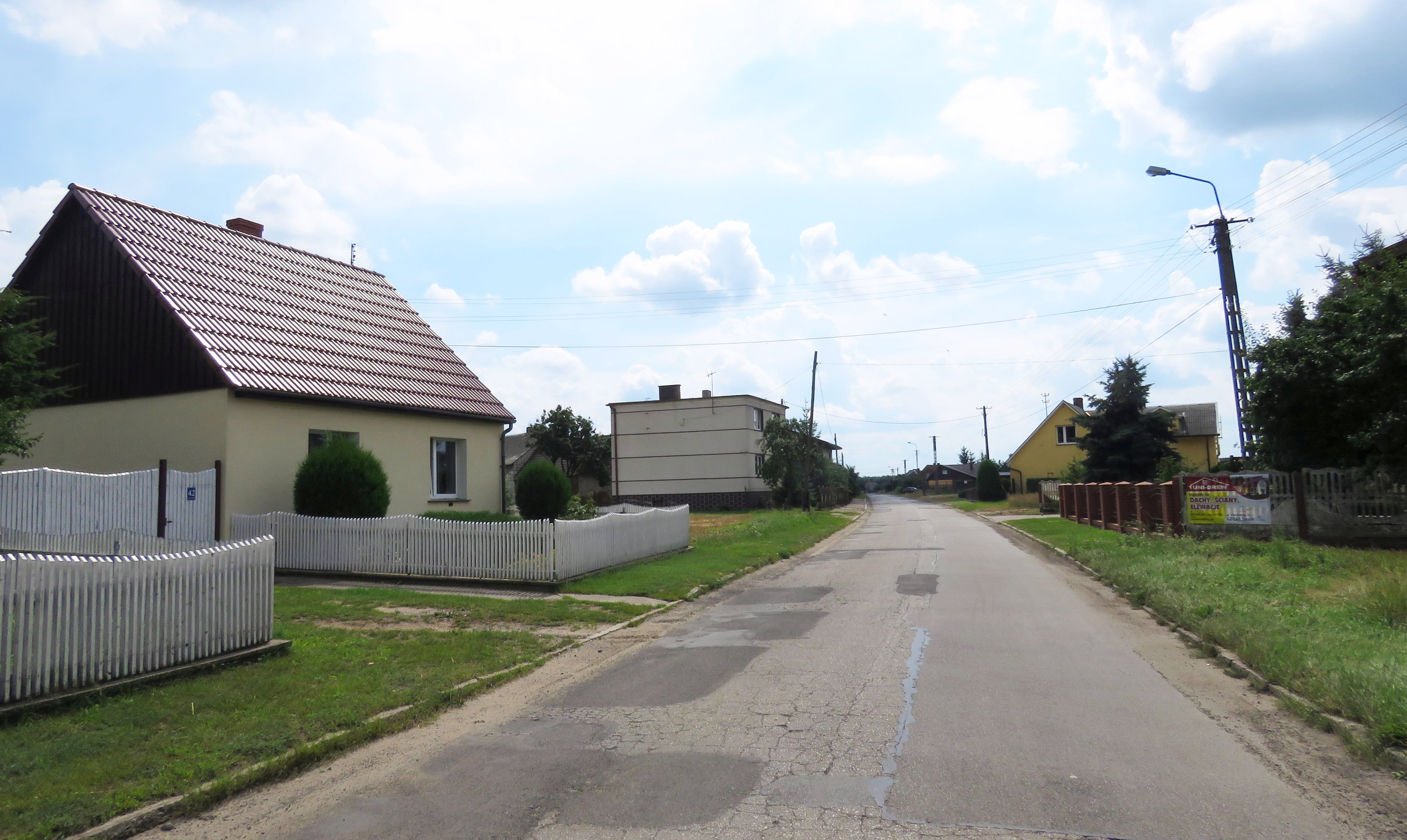

- Location within Poland
- Coordinates: 52°32′51″N 18°11′23″E
- Country: Poland
- Voivodeship: Kuyavian-Pomeranian
- County: Mogilno
- Gmina: Jeziora Wielkie

Nowa Wieś [ˈnɔva ˈvjɛɕ] is a village in the administrative district of Gmina Jeziora Wielkie, within Mogilno County, Kuyavian-Pomeranian Voivodeship, in north-central Poland.
