= Golejewo, Kuyavian-Pomeranian Voivodeship =

Golejewo
- Village
- Location within Poland
- Coordinates: 52°34′09″N 18°17′52″E
- Country: Poland
- Voivodeship: Kuyavian-Pomeranian
- County: Mogilno
- Gmina: Jeziora Wielkie

Golejewo [ɡɔlɛˈjɛvɔ] is a village in the administrative district of Gmina Jeziora Wielkie, within Mogilno County, Kuyavian-Pomeranian Voivodeship, in north-central Poland.
