= Gaj, Mogilno County =

Gaj
- Village
- Location within Poland
- Coordinates: 52°31′20″N 18°09′20″E
- Country: Poland
- Voivodeship: Kuyavian-Pomeranian
- County: Mogilno
- Gmina: Jeziora Wielkie

Gaj [ɡai̯] is a village in the administrative district of Gmina Jeziora Wielkie, within Mogilno County, Kuyavian-Pomeranian Voivodeship, in north-central Poland.
