= Berlinek, Kuyavian-Pomeranian Voivodeship =

Berlinek
- Village
- Location within Poland
- Coordinates: 52°59′N 15°12′E
- Country: Poland
- Voivodeship: Kuyavian-Pomeranian
- County: Mogilno
- Gmina: Jeziora Wielkie

Berlinek [bɛrˈlinɛk] is a village in the administrative district of Gmina Jeziora Wielkie, within Mogilno County, Kuyavian-Pomeranian Voivodeship, in north-central Poland.

Between 1975 and 1998 it was administered as part of the Bydgoszcz Voivodeship.
