= Jeziora Wielkie =

- Village
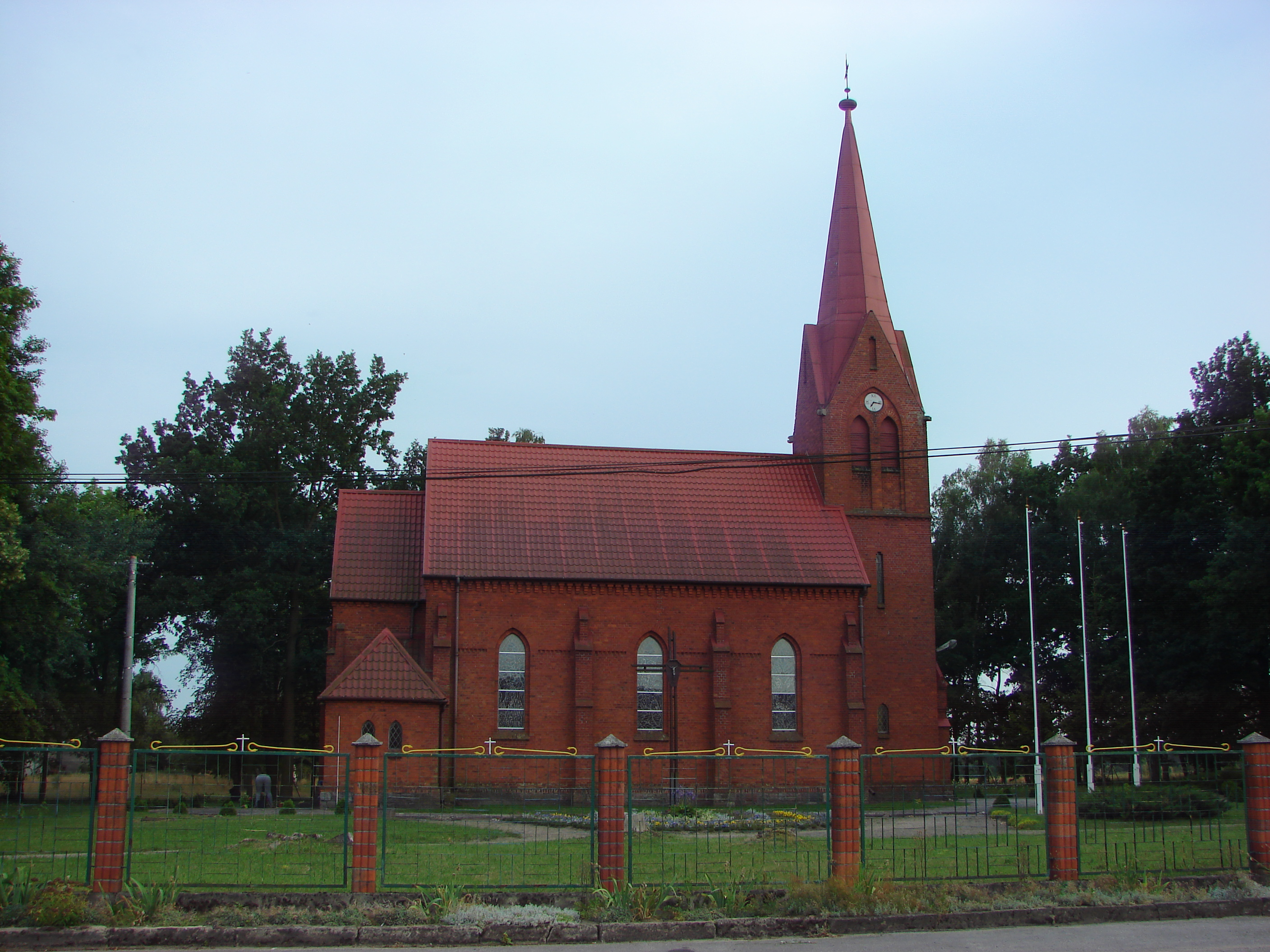
- Parish church

- Location within Poland
- Coordinates: 52°31′49″N 18°16′4″E
- Country: Poland
- Voivodeship: Kuyavian-Pomeranian
- County: Mogilno
- Gmina: Jeziora Wielkie
- Population: 560

Jeziora Wielkie [jɛˈʑɔra ˈvjɛlkʲɛ] is a village in Mogilno County, Kuyavian-Pomeranian Voivodeship, in north-central Poland. It is the seat of the gmina (administrative district) called Gmina Jeziora Wielkie.
