= Kościeszki, Kuyavian-Pomeranian Voivodeship =

Kościeszki
- Village
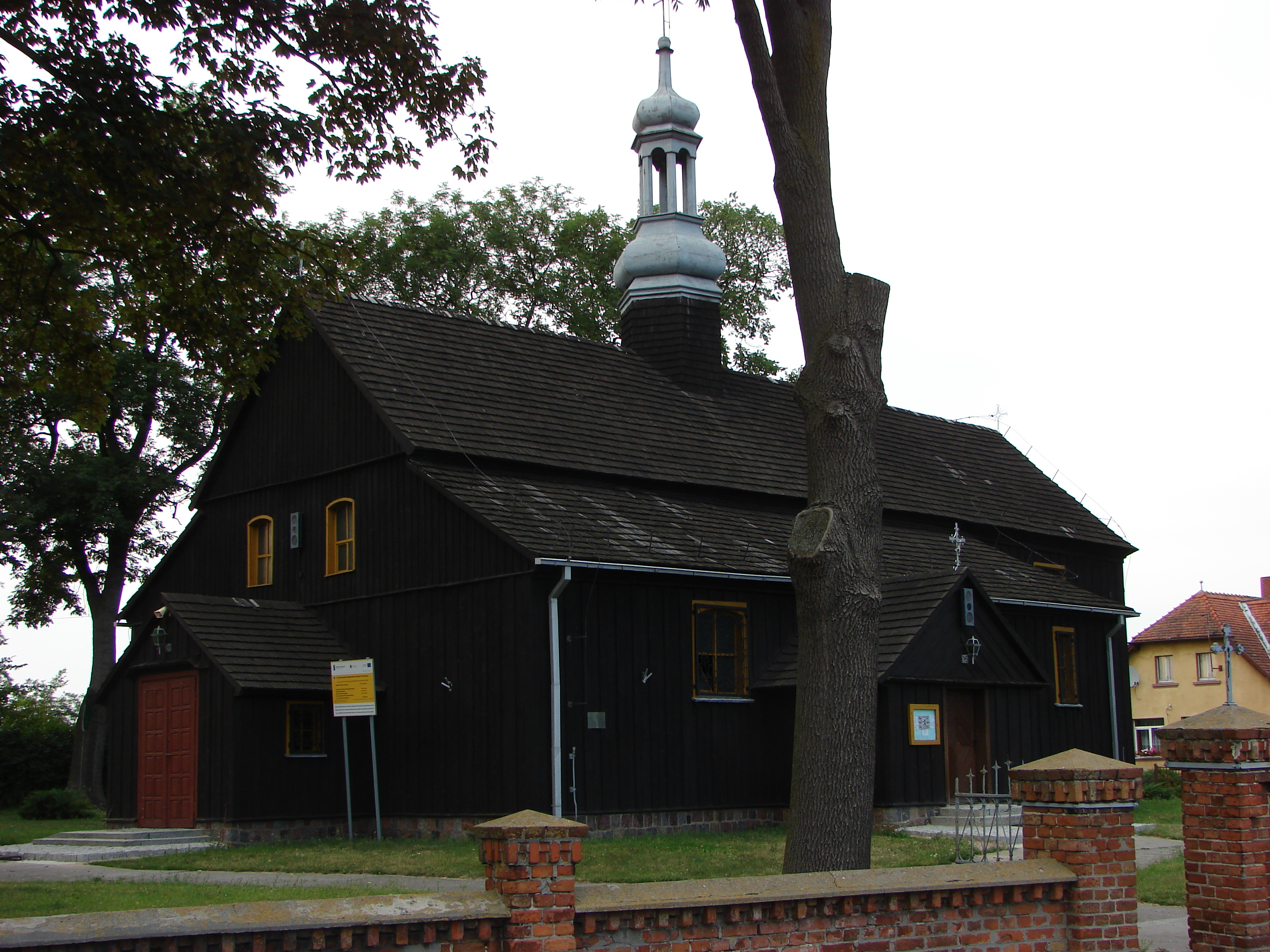
- Parish church of Saint Ann. Built 1760.

- Location within Poland
- Coordinates: 52°34′10″N 18°19′8″E
- Country: Poland
- Voivodeship: Kuyavian-Pomeranian
- County: Mogilno
- Gmina: Jeziora Wielkie

Kościeszki [kɔɕˈt͡ɕɛʂki] is a village in the administrative district of Gmina Jeziora Wielkie, within Mogilno County, Kuyavian-Pomeranian Voivodeship, in north-central Poland.
