= Wójcin, Mogilno County =

Wójcin
- Village
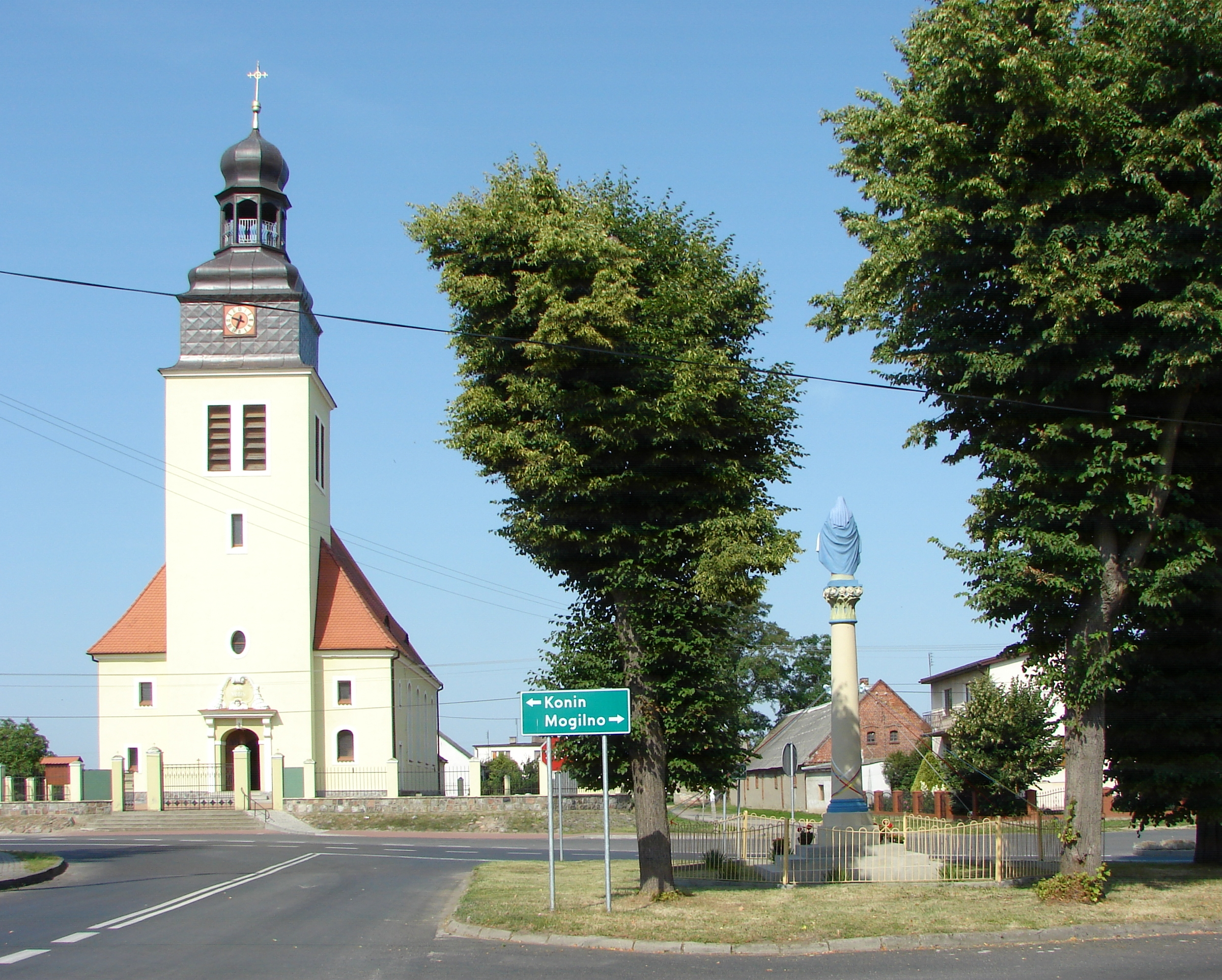
- Village center with the Saint John the Baptist church

- Location within Poland
- Coordinates: 52°31′06″N 18°11′00″E
- Country: Poland
- Voivodeship: Kuyavian-Pomeranian
- County: Mogilno
- Gmina: Jeziora Wielkie
- Population: 800
- Time zone: UTC+1 (CET)
  - Summer (DST): UTC+2 (CEST)
- Vehicle registration: CMG

Wójcin [ˈvui̯t͡ɕin] is a village in the administrative district of Gmina Jeziora Wielkie, within Mogilno County, Kuyavian-Pomeranian Voivodeship, in central Poland. It is chiefly agricultural and has about 800 inhabitants.

== History ==
As part of the region of Greater Poland, i.e. the cradle of the Polish state, the area formed part of Poland since its establishment in the 10th century. The first notes about Wójcin come from 1065. The name of the village was taken from the legendary first resident - Wojuta. The village was destroyed twice by the Teutonic Knights (1331) and Swedish troops (1703). Wójcin was a private church village, administratively located in the Gniezno County in the Kalisz Voivodeship in the Greater Poland Province of the Kingdom of Poland.

During the Partitions of Poland it was annexed by Prussia. Following the successful Greater Poland uprising of 1806, it was regained by Poles and included within the short-lived Duchy of Warsaw. Following the duchy's dissolution in 1815, the village was reannexed by Prussia, and was located near the border between the Prussian and Russian partitions of Poland. On the night of January 12, 1863 there was a battle between Polish insurgents of the January Uprising and Prussian patrol of soldiers, which tried to stop the Poles from crossing the border to the Russian Partition. Following World War I, in 1918, Poland regained independence and the Greater Poland uprising broke out, which goal was to reintegrate the region with Poland. One of the organizers of the uprising in the area was Włodzimierz Skrzydlewski from Wójcin. The uprising was successful, and Wójcin returned to Poland.

=== Second World War ===
During the German occupation, the local Polish population was persecuted. Parish priest Stanisław Kowalczyk was arrested in 1940 and imprisoned in the Oranienburg concentration camp where he was killed (see Nazi persecution of the Catholic Church in Poland). Also teacher Walerian Prus died because of German's abuse. In 1940, the occupiers also carried out expulsions of Poles, whose houses and farms were then handed over to German colonists as part of the Lebensraum policy. Expelled Poles were either enslaved as forced labour of new German colonists in the region or deported to the General Government in the more eastern part of German-occupied Poland. The Wójcin area was liberated on January 21, 1945, by Soviet soldiers and restored to Poland.

== Historic sights ==
Historically significant buildings include the Saint John the Baptist Church built in 1916 and the old palace from the beginning of the twentieth century (the former owner was the Skrzydlewski family). There are also graves of insurgents of the Greater Poland uprising of 1918–1919 in the village.

== Tourist centre ==
There is a lake called Jezioro Wójcińskie which is part of Jezioro Ostrowieckie. Near the lake, there are a lot of tourist residents

== Education ==
- Primary school

== Sport ==
- Football team - Tarant Wójcin

== Bibliography ==
- Tadeusz Ciałkowski : "Ziemia Jeziorańska.Zarys historyczny gminy Jeziora Wielkie" ; Gminny Komitet Ochrony Pomników Walki i Męczeństwa w Jeziorach Wielkich ; 1990
