= Siedlimowo =

- Village
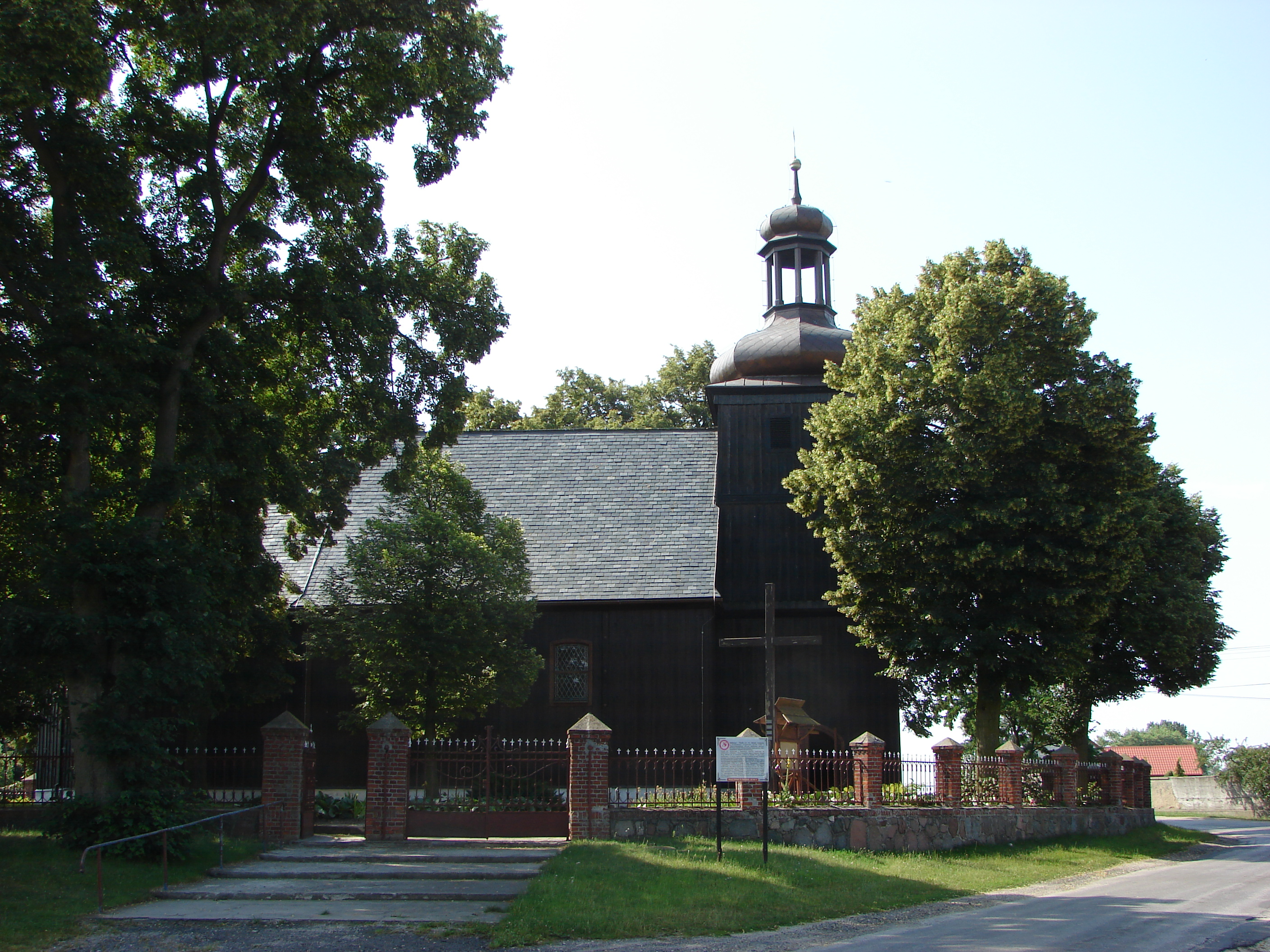
- Parish church of Saint Michael, built 1786.

- Location within Poland
- Coordinates: 52°29′N 18°14′E
- Country: Poland
- Voivodeship: Kuyavian-Pomeranian
- County: Mogilno
- Gmina: Jeziora Wielkie
- Population: 250

Siedlimowo [ɕɛdliˈmɔvɔ] is a village in the administrative district of Gmina Jeziora Wielkie, within Mogilno County, Kuyavian-Pomeranian Voivodeship, in north-central Poland.
