= Tarant Wójcin =

- Full name: Ludowy Zespół Sportowy; Tarant Wójcin
- Founded: 1993; 33 years ago
- Ground: OSiR Stadium
- Capacity: 500
- Chairman: Dariusz Dobrochowski
- Manager: Dawid Mańkowski
- League: Klasa A Bydgoszcz II
- 2023–24: Klasa A Bydgoszcz II, 5th of 14

LZS Tarant Wójcin is a Polish football club based in Wójcin. As of the 2024–25 season, they compete in the playing in Bydgoszcz II group of the Klasa A. The club's history started in the early 1990s when the club joined KPZPN and started playing in the Klasa B. In June 2006, Tarant Wójcin won promotion to the Klasa A, but was disbanded in 2009 before being re-founded in 2011. The team kit consists of a white shirt with blue arms, blue shorts and blue socks.

== History ==
The history of Tarant began in the 1993. In that time, a group of people from the local area decided to reactivate the old club Błękitni Wójcin. This club was quite popular in the arena in 70th and 80th. However, they called themselves Tarant, which means a kind of horse, but used the colours of Błękitni. The main person behind founding Tarant was Karol Łaszkiewicz - player, chairman and manager in one person. Thanks to his attitude, the club could exist many years until now. The first year of existence was quite difficult. The team had to play their home matches far from home, because there wasn't any pitch nearby they could use to host home games. In the late 90s, Tarant finally got a pitch and could play at home.

In the 2005–06 season, Tarant achieved its first success by winning promotion to the Klasa A. In the first season in the seventh tier, they finished in 5th. Next season saw Karol Łaszkiewicz leave the club - he resigned after a humiliating 0–8 defeat to Burza Nowa Wieś Wielka. Former player Gerard Ziółkowski became the new chairman of club. The team ended the 2007–08 season in ninth place. The 2008–09 season was at the same time the best and the worst in Tarant's history - the team won promotion to the regional league, but due to financial problems, the team was incorporated and renamed on Kujawskie-Pogranicze Jeziora Wielkie. The last game of Tarant Wójcin took place on 2 August 2009, in a regional Polish Cup against Orłowianka Orłowo. The result was 3–3, with Tarant winning the penalty shootout 3–2. The last goal for the 'old' Tarant was scored by Waldemar Humaj.

After folding in 2009, the team refounded in 2011, and started competing in the Klasa B.

The most notable people of team are the former captain Dariusz Budkiewicz, Mariusz Mochański and the manager Karol Łaszkiewicz.

== Rivals ==
The main rivals of Tarant Wójcin were two clubs from the same commune - LZS Gopło Kościeszki and LZS Jeziora Wielkie.

== Records ==
- Biggest win: Tarant Wójcin – Kujawiak Sukowy - 13–0, Klasa B, 2004–05
- Biggest defeat: Tarant Wójcin – Burza Nowa Wieś Wielka - 0–8, Klasa A, 2007–08
