= Artur Kołosowski =

Artur Stanisław Kołosowski
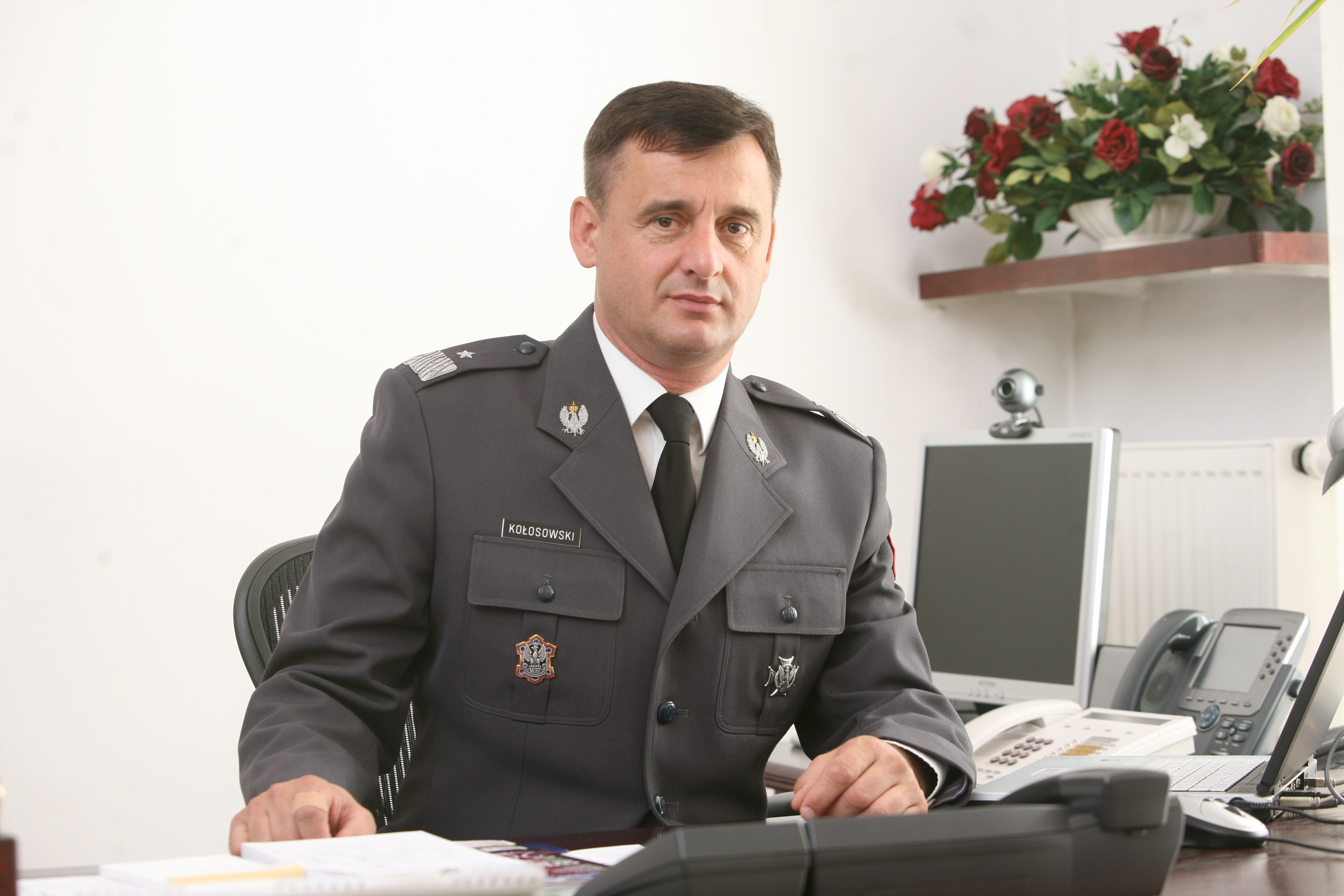
- Born: 1958 (age 67–68); Orneta, Poland
- Military career
- Allegiance: Poland
- Branch: Polish Air Force
- Service years: 1977–2012
- Rank: Brigadier General (Ret)

Artur Stanisław Kołosowski (born 1958) is a brigadier general of Polish Armed Forces. President of the board, and CEO in joint-stock company. Graduate of MBA studies. Visiting professor at the Military University of Technology in Warsaw and the author of numerous publications within the scope of national defence and security, and cybersecurity. Chairman of the Supervisory Board in the Polish Armaments Group Inc. (PGZ S.A). Director of the Operational Center of the Minister of National Defence.

== Domestic education ==
Graduate of Cybernetic Faculty from the Military University of Technology in Warsaw (1977–1982). Master of Science in Engineering with specialisation in computer systems. He completed postgraduate management studies at the Warsaw School of Economics (2004), MBA program of the University of Illinois (2006), also the higher defence course and tactical-operational course at the National Defence University in Warsaw. He participated in many training courses in the field of business management, enterprise management, and performance of the duties in state-owned enterprises (Business Development Institute - 2009). He passed the exam for candidates to the supervisory boards of state-owned companies (2009).

=== International education ===
He completed an instructor English course in the Defense Language Institute at Lackland Air Force Base in San Antonio, Texas, USA (1994) and defense resource management course in the Defense Resources Management Institute in Monterey, California, USA (1997). He is also a graduate of a flag officers and ambassadors’ course in the NATO Defense College in Rome (2011).

== Military career ==
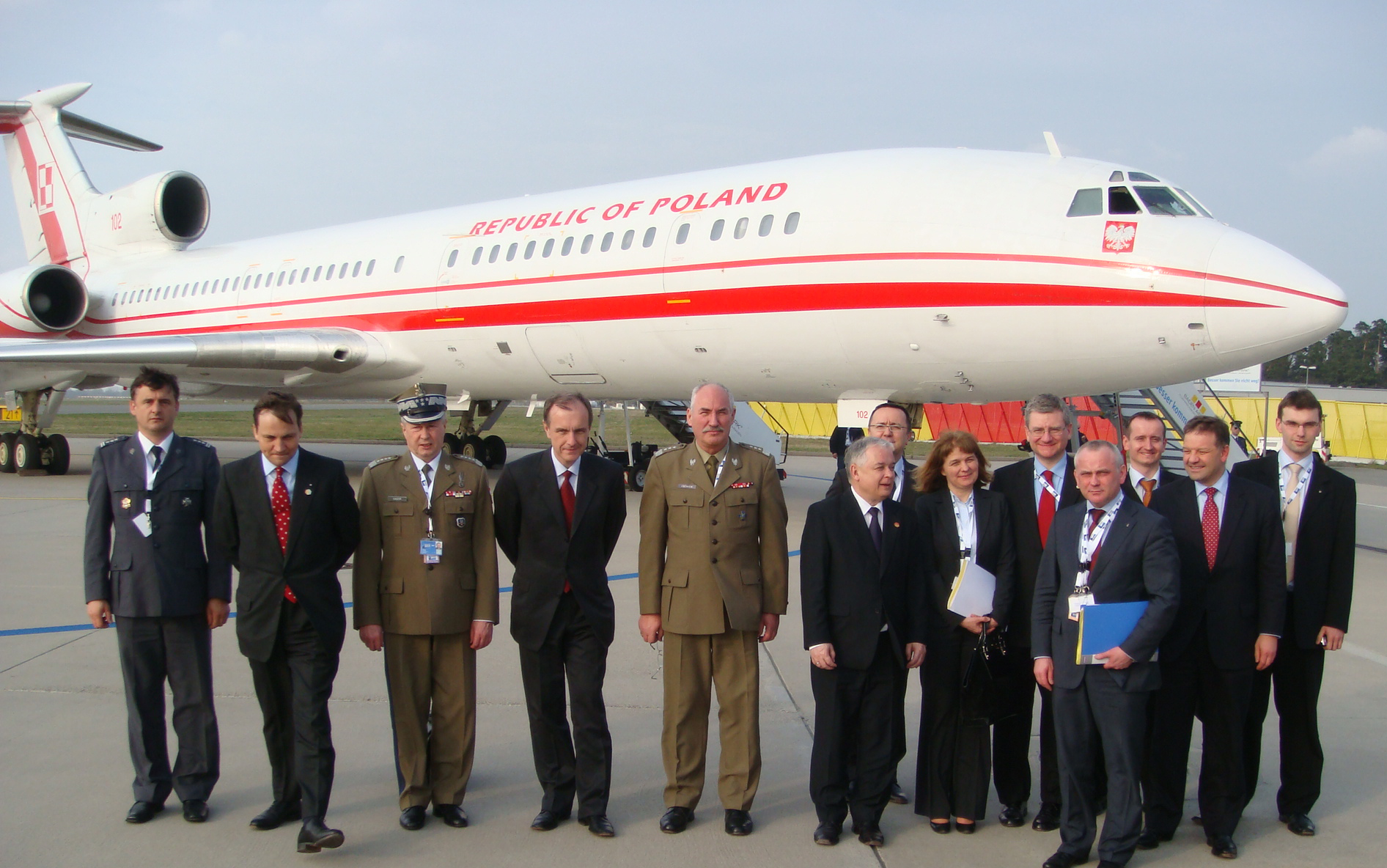
The 60th NATO summit (2009)

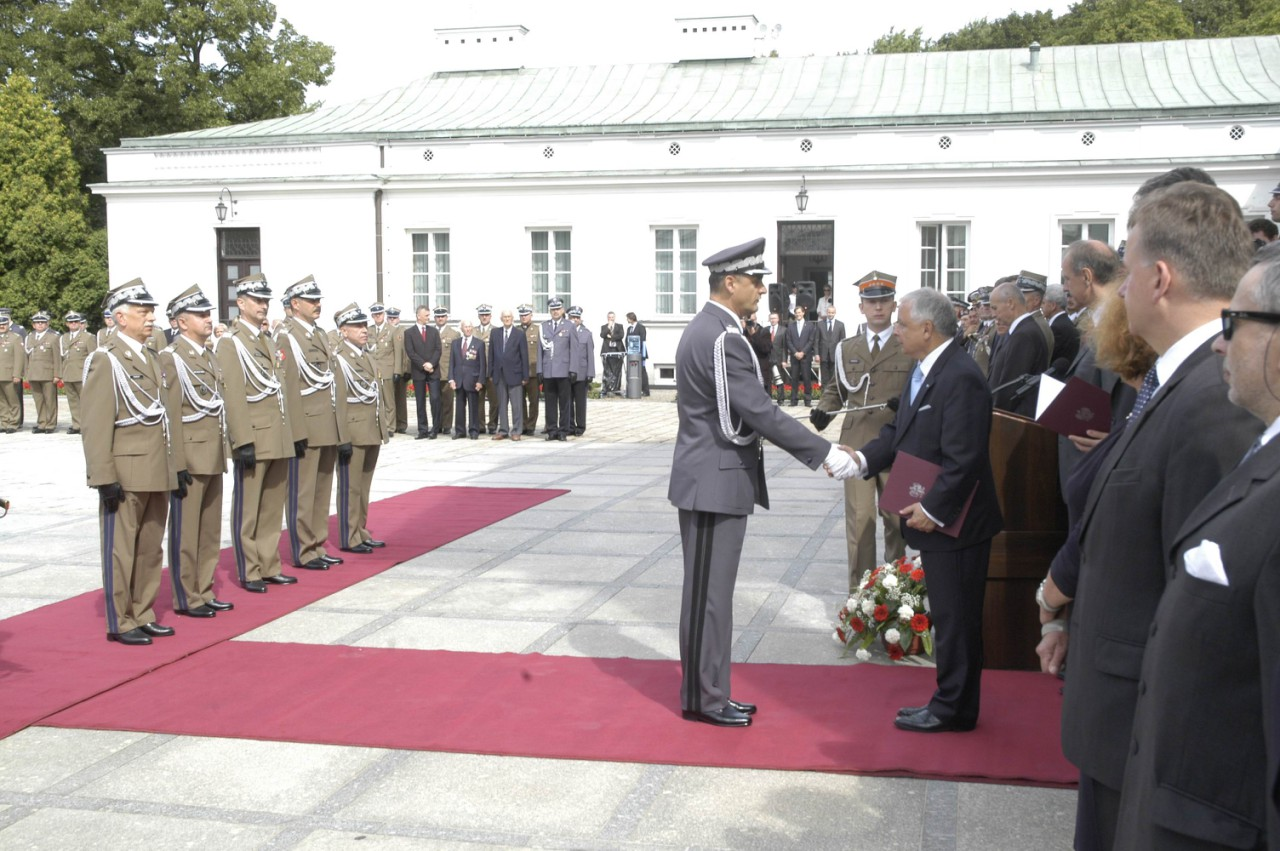
Nomination to the rank of Brigadier General (2009)

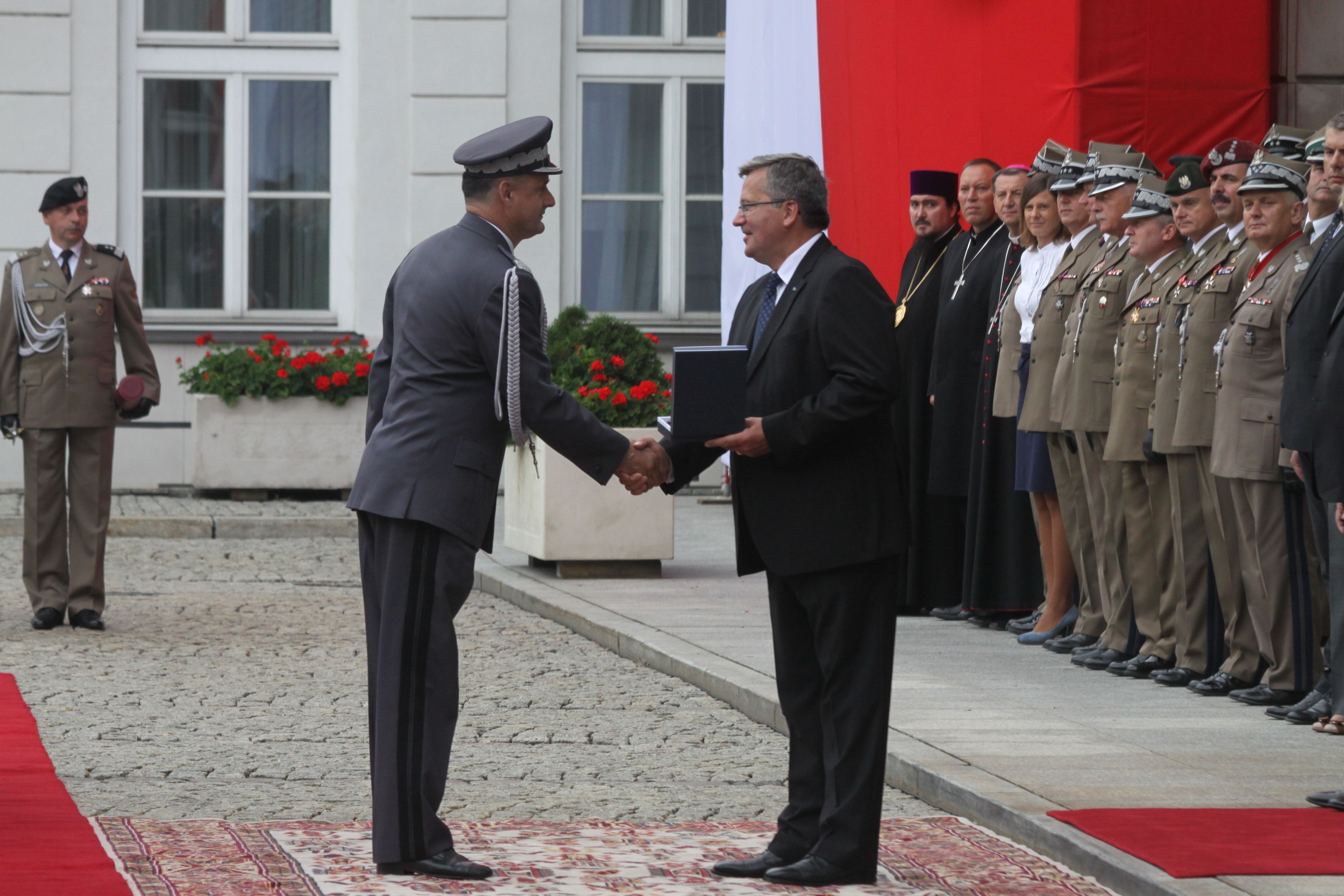
The President of Poland bids farewell to Brigadier General Artur Kolosowski (2012)

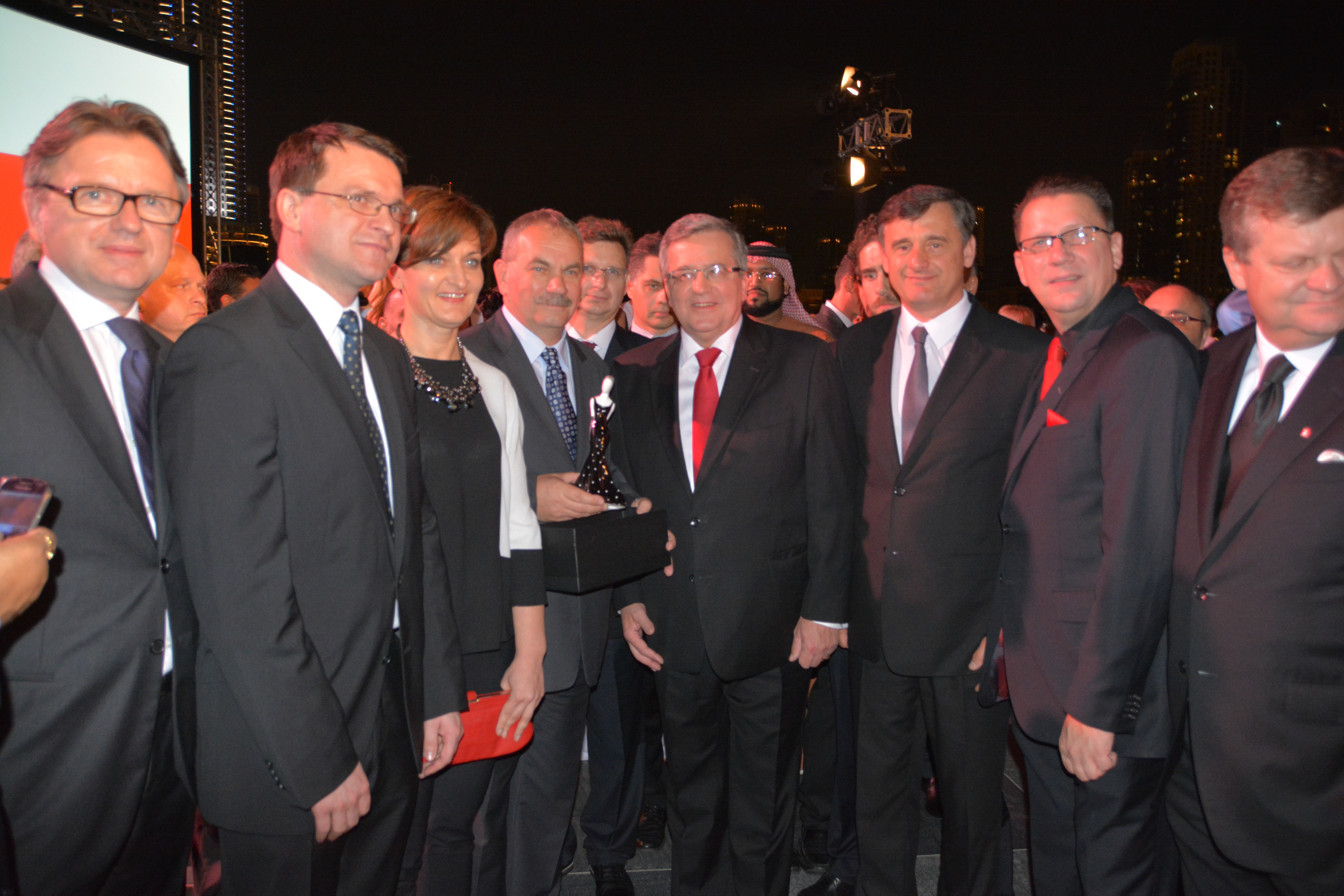
Entrepreneurship delegation with the President of Poland to the Persian Gulf (2013)

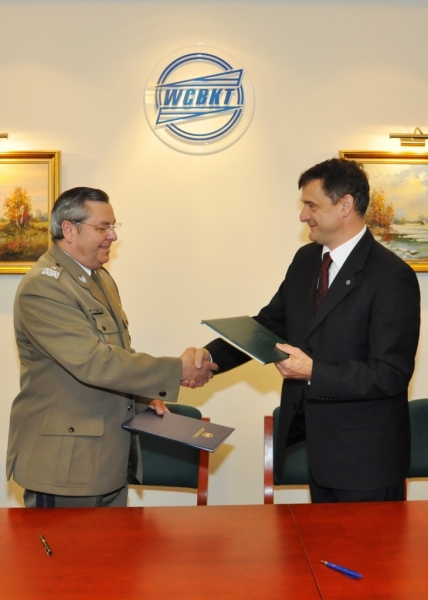
Signing the contract with the Chancellor of Military University of Technology in Warsaw (2012)

After graduating from the Military University of Technology he was associated with Air Defence and Air Force units (1982–1999), primarily as an electronics engineer of C3 (communications, command and control) equipment for radio engineering units. In the years 1982–1987 he dealt with C3 systems in the Radio-Technical Military College, where he worked on radiolocation subsystems, imitators and tactical simulators for guiding aircraft to targets. In 1987–1994 he gave lectures and tutorials in the field of radar equipment, digital devices and simulators. After completing the instructor course, he became the director of the foreign language section at the Radio-Electronics Training Centre (1994).

He was a supervisor of the Organization for Security and Co-operation in Europe (OSCE) in the Republika Srpska (1997) and Montenegro (1998).

In 1999, as a foreign affairs expert, he began his service in the Ministry of National Defence (MoD) - Press and Information Office, where, among other things, he represented MoD in the NATO Audiovisual Working Group. In the years 2000–2001 he served in the office of the Under Secretary of State for Defence Policy, where his responsibilities included international affairs and foreign contacts. In 2002, he returned to the MoD Press and Information Office for the position of deputy director.

In the years 2003–2007 he held the director position in the Department of Defence in the Office of Electronic Communications and, among other duties, he supervised telecommunications companies in terms of national defence and security. At the time he was also a Polish representative to Civil Communications Planning Committee (CCPC) NATO.

From November 2007 to September 2010, he served as director of the Secretariat of the Minister of National Defence. He organized minister's national and international activities, and he was directly involved in the implementation of the MoD key projects. On August 15, 2009, he was nominated to the rank of Brigadier General by the President of Poland. From September 2010 to May 2012, as the director of MoD Personnel Department, he coordinated military HRM (human resource management) policies on behalf of the minister.

The years 2007–2012, during which he performed the tasks in the strict leadership of Polish Ministry of National Defence, were crucial for the Polish Armed Forces. At this time, the compulsory military service was abolished and the professionalization of the military became a fact. It was also the time when the mission of Polish troops in Iraq was completed. There were also numerous activities in the field of crisis response, associated with the tragic aircraft crashes and natural disasters.

On July 31, 2012, he ended his professional career in the military service and on August 15, 2012, on Polish Armed Forces Day, he was officially farewelled by the President of the Republic of Poland.

From August 2012 till July 2016 he was the president of the board and CEO of the Central Military Bureau of Design and Technology JSC (WCBKT S.A.) which is engaged in research and development projects, development of prototypes, manufacturing and servicing of ground support equipment (GSE) for military and civilian aviation, as well as training equipment for land forces. WCBKT S.A. belongs to the Polish Armaments Group (PGZ S.A.). Artur Kolosowski was involved in building a new domain for the PGZ S.A - cybertechnologies domain. He also took part in NIAG (NATO Industry Advisory Group) works in area of cybersecurity.

Current roles: Chairman of the Supervisory Board in the Polish Armaments Group Inc. (PGZ S.A). Director of the Operational Center of the Minister of National Defence.

== Awards ==
- Gold Medal of Armed Forces In the Service of the Fatherland awarded by the Minister of National Defence for the long service i the Polish Armed Forces.
- Gold Medal of Merit for National Defence awarded by the Minister of National Defence for meritorious activities to strengthen military power of the country.
- Gold Medal for long Service awarded by the President of Poland for 35 years of honorable military service.
- Silver Cross of Merit awarded by the President of Poland for exemplary public service or humanitarian work that goes above and beyond the call of duty.
- Pro Memoria Medal awarded by the head of the Office for War Veterans and Victims of Oppression for outstanding contributions in perpetuating the memory of the people and deeds in the struggle for Polish independence during SWW.

== Private life ==
Artur is married and has two sons. Hobbies and interests: literature, water sports, classical music
