= Proszyska =

- Village
- Location within Poland
- Coordinates: 52°33′37″N 18°13′09″E
- Country: Poland
- Voivodeship: Kuyavian-Pomeranian
- County: Mogilno
- Gmina: Jeziora Wielkie

Proszyska [prɔˈʂɨska] is a village in the administrative district of Gmina Jeziora Wielkie, within Mogilno County, Kuyavian-Pomeranian Voivodeship, in north-central Poland.
