= Gmina Jeziora Wielkie =

Gmina Jeziora Wielkie Jeziora Wielkie Commune
- Gmina
- Coat of arms
- Interactive map of Gmina Jeziora Wielkie
- Coordinates (Jeziora Wielkie): 52°31′49″N 18°16′4″E
- Country: Poland
- Voivodeship: Kuyavian-Pomeranian
- County: Mogilno
- Seat: Jeziora Wielkie

Area
  - Total: 123.96 km^{2} (47.86 sq mi)

Population (2006)
  - Total: 5,034
  - Density: 40.61/km^{2} (105.2/sq mi)
- Website: https://web.archive.org/web/20071211133815/http://www.jeziorawielkie.pl/

Gmina Jeziora Wielkie is a rural gmina (administrative district) in Mogilno County, Kuyavian-Pomeranian Voivodeship, in north-central Poland. Its seat is the village of Jeziora Wielkie, which lies approximately 26 kilometres (16 mi) south-east of Mogilno, 61 km (38 mi) south-west of Toruń, and 68 km (42 mi) south of Bydgoszcz.

The gmina covers an area of 123.96 square kilometres (47.9 sq mi), and as of 2006 its total population is 5,034.

The gmina contains part of the protected area called Gopło Landscape Park.

== Villages ==
Gmina Jeziora Wielkie contains the villages and settlements of Berlinek, Budy, Dobsko, Gaj, Golejewo, Jeziora Wielkie, Kościeszki, Kożuszkowo, Krzywe Kolano, Kuśnierz, Lenartowo, Lubstówek, Nowa Wieś, Nożyczyn, Pomiany, Proszyska, Przyjezierze, Radunek, Rzeszyn, Rzeszynek, Siedlimowo, Siemionki, Sierakowo, Włostowo, Wójcin, Wola Kożuszkowa, Wycinki, Wysoki Most and Żółwiny.

== Neighbouring gminas ==
Gmina Jeziora Wielkie is bordered by the gminas of Kruszwica, Orchowo, Skulsk, Strzelno and Wilczyn.
