= Budy, Mogilno County =

Budy
- Village
- Location within Poland
- Coordinates: 52°34′26″N 18°15′27″E
- Country: Poland
- Voivodeship: Kuyavian-Pomeranian
- County: Mogilno
- Gmina: Jeziora Wielkie

Budy [ˈbudɨ] is a village in the administrative district of Gmina Jeziora Wielkie, within Mogilno County, Kuyavian-Pomeranian Voivodeship, in north-central Poland.
