= Kożuszkowo =

- Village
- Location within Poland
- Coordinates: 52°31′28″N 18°12′46″E
- Country: Poland
- Voivodeship: Kuyavian-Pomeranian
- County: Mogilno
- Gmina: Jeziora Wielkie

Kożuszkowo [kɔʐuʂˈkɔvɔ] is a village in the administrative district of Gmina Jeziora Wielkie, within Mogilno County, Kuyavian-Pomeranian Voivodeship, in north-central Poland.

== Notable persons ==
- John Mojecki - Polish activist on Staten Island
