= Robert Kuśnierz =

Polish historian

Robert Kuśnierz (born 1977) is a Polish historian (dr.hab.), Sovietologist.

== Books ==
- Kołakowski, Piotr; Kuśnierz, Robert (2014). Afera Rana. Zatrzymanie przez sowiecki kontrwywiad por. Stefana Kasperskiego w świetle jego sprawozdania z 12 sierpnia 1936 r. Kraków. p. 232. ISBN 978-83-7730-124-1. (co-author, co-editor with Piotr Kołakowski).
- W świecie stalinowskich zbrodni. Ukraina w latach czystek i terroru (1934–1938) w obserwacjach i analizach MSZ oraz wywiadu wojskowego Drugiej Rzeczypospolitej, Słupsk 2013, 428p (nominowana w 2015 r. do Nagrody Naukowej im. Jerzego Giedroycia). ISBN 978-83-7467-214-6
- Holodomor. The Great Famine in Ukraine 1932–1933 (co-author, co-editor), Warsaw – Kiev, pp.. 648
- Pomór w „raju bolszewickim”. Głód na Ukrainie w latach 1932–1933 w świetle polskich dokumentów dyplomatycznych i dokumentów wywiadu., Toruń 2008, 205p. a publication with previously unknown Polish documents about Holodomor.
- Ukraina w latach kolektywizacji i Wielkiego Głodu (1929–1933), Toruń 2005, 336p.

== Awards ==
- 2007: Order of Merit (Ukraine) of III degree
