= Allied Quality Assurance Publications =

Standards for quality assurance systems developed by NATO

The Allied Quality Assurance Publications (AQAP) are standards for quality assurance systems developed by NATO.

The aim of the AQAP agreement is to define standards for Quality Assurance of defence products. These standards are an integral part of contracts awarded in the military field involving NATO member countries. AQAP documents are therefore important to contractors and companies wanting to bid for such contracts.

The AQAP system is described in Standardization Agreement 4107 issued by the NATO Standardization Agency. There are currently two main types of AQAP documents: "Contractual Type" which are written as a Technical Specification intended for contractual use and "Guidance Type" which provide general guidance.

== List of current AQAP publications ==
- AQAP 2000 NATO Policy on an Integrated Systems Approach to Quality through the Life Cycle
- AQAP 2070 NATO Mutual Government Quality Assurance (GQA) Process
- AQAP 2105 NATO Requirements for Deliverable Quality Plans
- AQAP 2110 NATO Quality Assurance Requirements for Design, Development and Production
- AQAP 2131 NATO Quality Assurance Requirements for Final Inspection
- AQAP 2210 NATO Supplementary Software Quality Assurance Requirements to AQAP 2110
- AQAP 2310 NATO Quality Management System Requirements for Aviation, Space and Defence Suppliers

== See also ==
- Quality management system
- ISO 9000
- AS 9100 - aerospace industry implementation of ISO 9000/1
