= Przyjezierze, Kuyavian-Pomeranian Voivodeship =

Przyjezierze
- Village
- Location within Poland
- Coordinates: 52°32′18″N 18°8′41″E
- Country: Poland
- Voivodeship: Kuyavian-Pomeranian
- County: Mogilno
- Gmina: Jeziora Wielkie
- Population: 200

Przyjezierze [pʂɨjɛˈʑɛʐɛ] is a village in the administrative district of Gmina Jeziora Wielkie(part of this village is administrated by Gmina Strzelno), within Mogilno County, Kuyavian-Pomeranian Voivodeship, in north-central Poland.
