= Hilla Becher =

German conceptual photographer

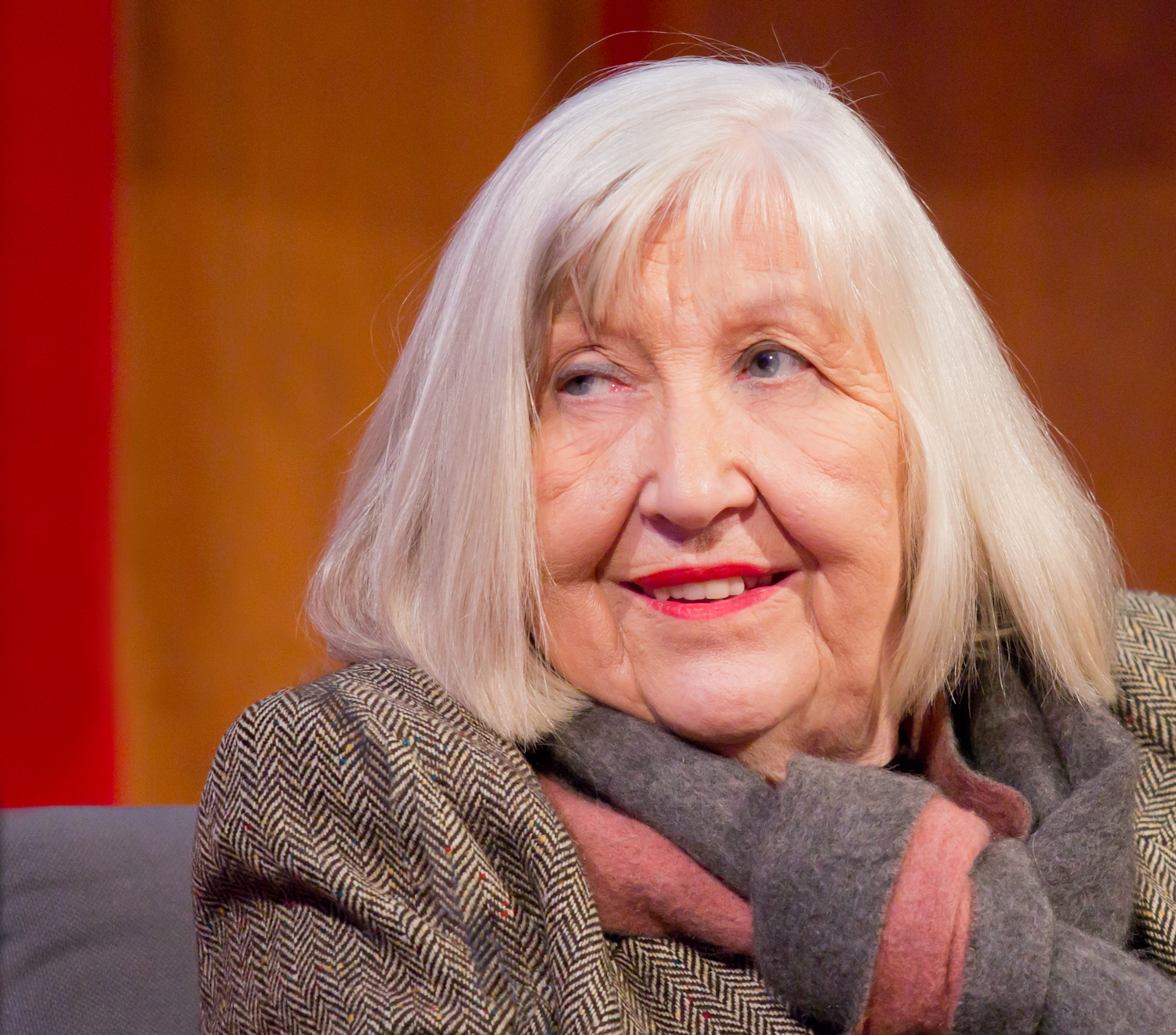
- Hilla Becher, 2013
- Born: Hilla Wobeser; 2 September 1934; Potsdam, Germany
- Died: 10 October 2015 (aged 81); Düsseldorf, Germany
- Education: Vocational School
- Known for: Conceptual Photography
- Notable work: Framework Houses
- Movement: Typographic
- Spouse: Bernd Becher

Hilla Becher (née Wobeser; 2 September 1934 – 10 October 2015) was a German conceptual photographer. Becher was well known for her industrial photographs, or typologies, with longtime collaborator and husband, Bernd Becher. Her career spanned more than 50 years and included photographs from the United States, France, Germany, the Netherlands, Great Britain, Belgium, Switzerland, Luxembourg, and Italy.

Becher, alongside her husband, received the Erasmus Prize and the Hasselblad Award. The Bechers founded the Düsseldorf School of Photography in the mid-1970s.

In 2015, she died from a stroke at age 81, in Düsseldorf.

== Childhood ==
Becher was born in Potsdam, East Germany. Her mother attended Lette-Haus, a photography school for women, and occasionally worked in a studio, retouching photographs. Her father was a high school language teacher, later drafted to World War II.

Hilla Becher was exposed to photography early in life. Becher began photographing at thirteen years old with a 9×12 cm plate-camera. Becher photographed her teachers in high school. She printed and sold photographs at postcard size for the teachers. She was expelled from high school and became an intern for Walter Eichgrun, a working studio and commissioned photographer, in 1951, while studying photography at a vocational school and finishing her high school degree in Berlin. She spent three years working on commission with Eichgrun and did various solo assignments. In 1954, she and her mother moved to West Germany, where she worked as a freelance photographer in Hamburg. In 1957, she was offered a job in Düsseldorf, Germany as an advertising photographer and around 1958, she enrolled into the Kunstakademie Düsseldorf under Walter Breker studying graphic design and printing techniques. She was "the first student to be admitted to the class on the basis of a portfolio consisting solely of photographs." She was also the lead instructor in the darkroom after she completed her apprenticeship with Walter Breker.

=== Bernd Becher ===
In 1957, Hilla Wobeser met Bernhard Becher, known as Bernd at the Kunstakademie Düsseldorf, where the two studied. They began a collaboration photographing the Siegerland region where Bernd was raised, and two years later, the couple got married in 1961. The Bechers traveled in a Volkswagen photographing industrial sites all over Germany, Belgium, Luxembourg, and France, then eventually, Britain and the US.

In an interview with Süddeutsche Zeitung Magazin, Hilla Becher claimed that her husband disliked photography at the beginning of the career. Originally a sketch artist, Bernd believed that photography was more a "means to an end" to further detail in his sketches rather than its own artistic medium. In the same interview, Hilla maintained that though the couple worked as a team, Bernd was the driving force because he was more of a perfectionist than she was.

Bernd died at 75 years old on 22 June 2007 from complications during heart surgery. By that time, their work had achieved worldwide acknowledgements, fascinating other photographers such as Stephen Shore. Their wide influence was also due to their roles as professors at Kunstakademie Düsseldorf, where some of their students included Candida Höfer, Andreas Gursky, and Thomas Ruff.

The couple, after Hilla's death in 2015, is survived by their only son, Max Becher, and his two children.

== Work ==
The beginning of their on-going project was part of the “...polemical return to the “straight” aesthetics and social themes of the 1920s and 1930s in response to the postpolitical and postindustrial subjectivist photographic aesthetics that arose in the early postwar period.” (Heckert, Virginia) Most subjects of the works of “...industrial structures-water towers, blast furnaces, gas tanks, mine heads, grain elevators, and the like-in the late 1950s.” (Heckert, Virginia) Bernd and Hilla Becher's once said about the works, “The idea is to make families of objects,” or, on another occasion, “to create families of motifs [that] become humanized and destroy one another, as in Nature where the older is devoured by the newer.” (Heckert, Virginia) Bernd and Hilla Becher's works are shown as a group to establish a “...movement itself from image to image to image aimed to be the story more than did the sum of the collected parts, regardless of whether it is the movement of the photographer himself or herself, or the camera, or the movement of our own eye as it skips from one photograph to the next.” (Heckert, Virginia).

The Becher's wanted to focus on what the images provide to the viewer when viewed together, e.g. an anatomy of the relations between constituent parts. Bernd and Hilla Becher's background with Germany and the inspirations from works of August Sander and company. Concepts such as ‘New Objectivity.’ Carrying forward Bernd and Hilla Becher's work is the machine age photographers, albeit complexly. Some describe it as “industrial archaeology” or “a contribution to the social history of industrial work.” Some criticisms of the concept, that those assumptions are misleading.

Bernd and Hilla Becher's state that they have always been upfront about the concept, “things which can be interesting for technical historians, [things] are not visually interesting for us.” Then continue, “We want to offer the audience a point of view, or rather a grammar, to understand and compare; the different structures,” is how they describe their ambition. Through photography, we try to arrange these shapes and render them comparable. To do so, the objects must be isolated from their context and freed from all association.” (Heckert, Virginia) Heckert then moves towards working between three separate attitudes that she states each can be said to be driving Becher project; commitment, delight, and enlightenment. Heckert concludes with an overview of Bernd and Hilla Becher's project criticisms and triumphs.

Hilla is credited for aiding in the start and structuring of the Kunstakademie Düsseldorf's Photography department. Hilla photographed with an 8×10 large format camera and processed her negatives by hand. After 50 years of photography the Bechers developed a distinguishable stylistic aesthetic. Over the years Hilla and Bernd Becher have had conflicting photographic approaches towards their subjects. Hilla wanted the subject to be photographed with its surroundings, while Bernd wanted the subject to be the only focal point. Becher's photographs are studies of industrial architecture and landscapes, the composition of the photograph forces the viewer to examine the structure. The photographs were captured during overcast skies early in the morning, to remove shadows and convey as many details as possible. When displayed, the images are often grouped in a grid pattern by subject or as diptychs.

=== Art ===
- Framework Houses, 1959–1973
- Water Towers, 1963–1993
- Fforchaman Colliery, Rhondda Valley, South Wales, United Kingdom, 1966
- Winding Towers, 1966–1997
- Knutange, Lorraine, France, 1971
- Hanover Mine 1/2/5, Bochum-Hordel, Ruhr Region..., 1973
- Coal Mine, Bear Valley, Schuylkill County... 1974
- Consolidation Mine, Gelsenkirchen, Ruhr Region
- Coal Tipple, Goodspring, Pennsylvania, 1975
- Water Towers, 1988.

=== Individual exhibitions ===
==== 1963 ====
- Galerie Ruth Nohl, Siegen, Germany

==== 1965 ====
- Galerie Pro, Bad Godesburg, Germany

==== 1966 ====
- Staatliche Kunstakademie, Düsseldorf

==== 1967 ====
- Staatliches Museum, Munich
- Technische Hochschule, Karlsruhe
- Bergbau-Museum, Bochum, Germany
- Kunstakademi, Copenhagen

==== 1968 ====
- Stedelijk Van Abbemuseum, Eindhoven, Netherlands
- Wachsman Institute, University of Southern California
- Goethe Center, San Francisco
- Galerie Ruth Nohl, Siegen, Germany
- Städtisches Museum, Mönchengladbach, Germany

==== 1969 ====
- Städtisches Kunsthalle, Düsseldorf

==== 1970 ====
- Moderna Museet, Stockholm
- Galerie Konrad Fischer, Düsseldorf
- Städtisches Museum, Ulm, Germany

==== 1971 ====
- Kabinett für Aktuelle Kunst, Bremerhaven, Germany
- Gegenverkehr, Aachen, Germany

==== 1972 ====
- Sonnabend Gallery, New York
- Bennington College, Vermont

==== 1973 ====
- Galleria Forma, Genoa
- Nigel Greenwood Inc., London
- Sonnabend Gallery, New York

==== 1974 ====
- Institute of Contemporary Art, London (traveled)
- San Diego Museum of Contemporary Art, California
- Sonnabend Gallery, New York

==== 1975 ====
- Rheinisches Landesmuseum, Bonn
- Museum of Modern Art, New York
- Sonnabend Gallery, New York
- Galleria Casteli, Milan

== Legacy ==
In response to a post-war Germanic period, Becher's "subjective photography" tries to humanize, naturalize, and synthesize Germany's history and idealization within the industrialized comportment. The Machine Age brought a visual pace that was "ever-accelerating, ever expanding" and highly juxtaposed to the past, more subdued, Germanic lifestyle. Becher sought to capture the underlying function and organization of this new ideal by ultimately picturing these differences in industrialization. Becher's work is often said to be continuous in that each photograph cannot stand on its own; Becher's work is a body of work and a thematic response in framing the political, enlightening, and responsive post-war Germany.

Becher's work was innovative in that, by capturing the post-war, she has ultimately defined Germany before mass industry and by the idealized past. Stimson, from Tate Paper, writes "by shooting the grand icons of the Machine Age 'straight-on' so they do not, they have claimed 'hide or exaggerate or depict anything in an untrue fashion', by committing themselves to an ethic of representation free of bogus political elevation or degradation, they realize one leg of their generation's postmodern affect". Such is the voice of Hilla and Bernd's work: they sought to represent Germany without ideology and without a politically charged atmosphere.

== Awards ==
- 1966: British Council grant to photograph mines in Nottinghamshire and south Wales.
- 2002: Erasmus Prize from the Praemium Erasmianum Foundation, Netherlands, for contribution to the Kunstakademie Düsseldorf, awarded to the Bechers.
- 2014: Großer Kulturpreis, sponsored by the Sparkassen-Kulturstiftung Rheinland, awarded to Hilla Becher.

== See also ==
- List of German women artists
