= Grapus =

French graphic design collective

Grapus was a collective of graphic artists working together between 1970 and 1991 that sought to combine excellence in design with a social conscience.

The work of the Grapus design collective belonged to the public square; it represented a dialogue between governments and citizens, culture and politics, and in the final analysis, the message and the form. Its visual communication in the public square was bold and honest; it was aware of its presence and its impact, and at the same time, it was informed by the socio-cultural parameters of time in all its dimensions—past, present, and expected future—which provided a contest for experimentation and innovation. Throughout their history, Grapus remained communists and idealists and continued to be operated collectively: all work left the studio signed ‘Grapus," even when their studio numbers had grown to around 20, operating in three separate collectives.

== History ==
Grapus is a collective of French designers and they were founded after the student movements of Paris in May 1968. Grapus sought to 'change life' by the twine dynamics of graphic arts and political action. The collective scorned the commercial advertising, and adhering to its founders idealistic principles, tried to bring culture to politics, and politics to culture.

The meaning behind Grapus's name was described by Bernard that it was functional-sounding, had vulgar overtones, and also had a "whiff of history to it," referring to French revolutionary Gracchus Babeuf. Another interpretation for the creation of the name Grapus, is it was a play on the words crapules staliniennes (Stalinist scum), was both a gesture of political allegiance and a sardonic provocation to potential critics.

The group was founded in France in 1970 by Pierre Bernard, who had studied with the Polish poster designer Henryk Tomaszewski; François Miehe; and Gérard Paris-Clavel, who had met during the student movement of May 1968 and were influenced by the subversive ideas and practices of the Situationist International. Alex Jordan and Jean-Paul Bachollet joined the group in 1975. After Miehe’s departure in 1978, the core of the group found its equilibrium.

The group's members were all members of the Communist party, and the group maintained an explicit political, social and cultural engagement. They at first rejected assignments with commercial and government clients, instead working with experimental theatre groups, progressive town councils, the Communist Party itself, the Communist trade union CGT, educational causes, and social institutions. Even in later years, when the staff had grown to 20, operating in three distinct groups, they signed all of their work simply "Grapus."

Grapus wore its Marxist heritage proudly, remaining devoted to the plebeian immediacy of posters, leaflets and bumper stickers. Among its recurring elements of style are the use of handwritten text, the use of an extensive symbolic vocabulary (e.g. hand, foot, moon, sun), and the convergence of diverse techniques (e.g. drawing, painting, photography, text), a technique known as "detournement, the rerouting of a message through acts of visual vandalism." Beginning in 1978, Grapus gained exposure in important exhibitions in Paris (Musée de l'Affiche), Amsterdam (Stedelijk Museum), Aspen, Colorado and Montréal (Musée d'art contemporain).

In 1990, after receiving the French "Grand prix national des arts graphiques", the collective faced a difficult ideological test when they had the opportunity to design the visual identity of the Louvre Museum. Bernard was in favour of taking the assignment, believing that design for cultural institutions could be a tool for social change. His partners wanted to design exclusively for social causes, found the Louvre to be elitist, and believed that taking the job would compromise their convictions. As a result, the collective decided to part ways in January 1991. Bernard, however, remains committed to a conception of design as a powerful tool for social commitment: "The dissemination of public graphic design to the most socially and/or culturally deprived, is one of the means to achieve the desired aims of community and social justice."

== Goals ==
"We are going to make images for you which will have real meaning. We are going to make true political images."

Graphic activists, came from their understanding of meaning and how to manipulate it. "We discovered semiology and it was very important to us," says Bernard. "It allowed us to deconstruct images, so we could say to political commissioning bodies.

This was something that was absolutely essential to Grapus. The idea was to form a production group, an artistic collective, to create high-quality images for the political struggle of the French Communist Party. It was both a political and a graphic commitment.

== Method and style ==
Grapus had a highly distinctive style. They provided inspiration to graphic design students all over the world through their idealistic principles. They often used bright colours, sensual forms, handwritten text, high-spirited visual pranks, and also very extensive symbolic vocabulary. The technique they used was known as detournement, which is the rerouting of a message through acts of visual vandalism.

They were considered in France as the M/M's punk/grunge aesthetic. This aesthetic challenged the older graphic design establishment. In the early 2000, when bands like Air and Daft Punk emerged, "the French music scene was completely dead." As a result, marketing music in France was enjoying a huge injection of finance. Since then, the so-called "French Touch" has helped young French graphic designers to emerge. Through their work as graphic designers and creative directors in the fields of art, fashion and music, "Amzalag" and Augustyniak have established M/M as a powerful force in contemporary French culture.

== Work ==
Their work focused heavily on posters. One important thing about these posters was that the subjects were new, at least for the French. They were theatrical posters, cinema posters dealing with poetry, sports. These subjects were not being addressed in France because, for the most part, poster-makers were working in advertising, more often than not for products.

Grapus's clients also speak to the group's controversial work. Clients didn’t tend to stay with Grapus very long. That’s one of the reasons why Grapus had financial problems, Grapus attitude towards day-to-day life excited clients, but at the same time it makes clients take risks. Clients don’t like to take one risk after another.

"Even in the successful campaigns, our clients often had a feeling that they had been abused by us. They felt that we rather forced their hands, that we’d expressed ourselves in their place. At some point they agree to the means of expression we use – they claim it as their own since we do the work in their name. Nevertheless they felt a bit frustrated. Perhaps that’s because we didn’t behave like suppliers, slavishly following their instructions. Rather, we were like equal partners, working towards a common goal, which they had decided to share with us by offering us the job. They may have felt slightly dispossessed. We are very aware of it with the passage of time, when we’ve spoken to them again later, or when other people have spoken to them." – Pierre Bernard

The posters were part of the struggle shared by students and workers, expressing its key ideas in the most direct public language available, inscribing the streets of Paris with these messages, and attaining a level of visibility and impact on the consciousness of spectators, in some locations, normally achieved only by commercial advertising

== Legacy ==
Grapus's split up was linked to a desire to continue the form of action which Grapus represented. In order to continue the Grapus mode of production, to begin a new form of adventure with new people. Their mode of production is one of conflict. "We are in conflict with the clients, but there is also conflict between us. Everyone can talk about and work on everyone else’s project." That principle of creative conflict has been very difficult to maintain in the 80s. When the old-timers start arguing between themselves, the younger people just leave. It’s like a conflict between the bosses rather than a conflict between creative peers. For the younger members of Grapus to play their part completely, we need complete equality. Thus forming three new Grapus groups.

The group's original members have maintained their principles in their work. Pierre Bernard, along with Dirk Behage and Fokke Draaijer, founded the Atelier de Création Graphique (ACG). They took the Louvre job and, among other works, designed the identity for the national parks of France, and signage for the Centre Pompidou. The ACG works in the areas of publishing, publicity and signage, as well as creating visual identity. Pierre Bernard has been a member of the Alliance Graphique Internationale since 1987, received the Erasmus Prize in 2006, and teaches graphic design in Paris at the École nationale supérieure des arts décoratifs (ENSAD).

Gérard Paris-Clavel joined with Vincent Perrottet to begin the studio les Graphistes Associés. Shortly thereafter, he left and formed the group Ne Pas Plier ("do not bend"), which broke with the traditional conception of a graphic studio by refusing "corporate" work, allying itself instead with sociologists, social workers, labourers, and other workers for public education.

Alex Jordan founded the studio Nous Travaillons Ensemble (NTE: "we work together") with Ronit Meirovitz and Anette Lenz, with whom he had worked within Grapus. They intended to pursue a seamless continuation of the Grapus approach, without being constricted by a paralyzing ideology. Since its creation in 1986, NTE has worked in partnership with the photographers’ association le bar Floréal, and has also collaborated on numerous works with the multidisciplinary organisation la Forge.

== Bibliography ==
- Darby, Angela. "Fusing Art and Design." Aesthetica.49 (2012): 50-5. ProQuest. Web. 30 Nov. 2015. "Grapus."—Social Design Notes. N.p., n.d. Web. 30 Nov. 2015. <http://backspace.com/notes/2002/09/grapus.php>.
- Glazenburg, Carolien. "Pierre Bernard." Stedelijk Museum Bulletin.4-5 (2006): 62,63, 98. ProQuest. Web. 30 Nov. 2015.
- Poynor, Rick. "Eye Magazine." Eye Magazine. N.p., n.d. Web. 30 Nov. 2015. <https://www.eyemagazine.com/feature/article/reputations-pierre-bernard>.
- "Rene Wanner's Poster Page / Book Reviews / Mon Travail Ce N'est Pas Mon Travail Pierre Bernard." Rene Wanner's Poster Page / Book Reviews / Mon Travail Ce N'est Pas Mon Travail Pierre Bernard. N.p., n.d. Web. 30 Nov. 2015. <http://www.posterpage.ch/reviews/re93bern/re93bern.htm>.
- "Utopian Image: Politics and Posters." Design Observer. N.p., n.d. Web. 30 Nov. 2015. <http://designobserver.com/feature/utopian-image-politics-and-posters/37739/>.
