= List of awards and nominations received by Steve McQueen =

Awards given to Steve McQueen

Steve McQueen awards and nominations
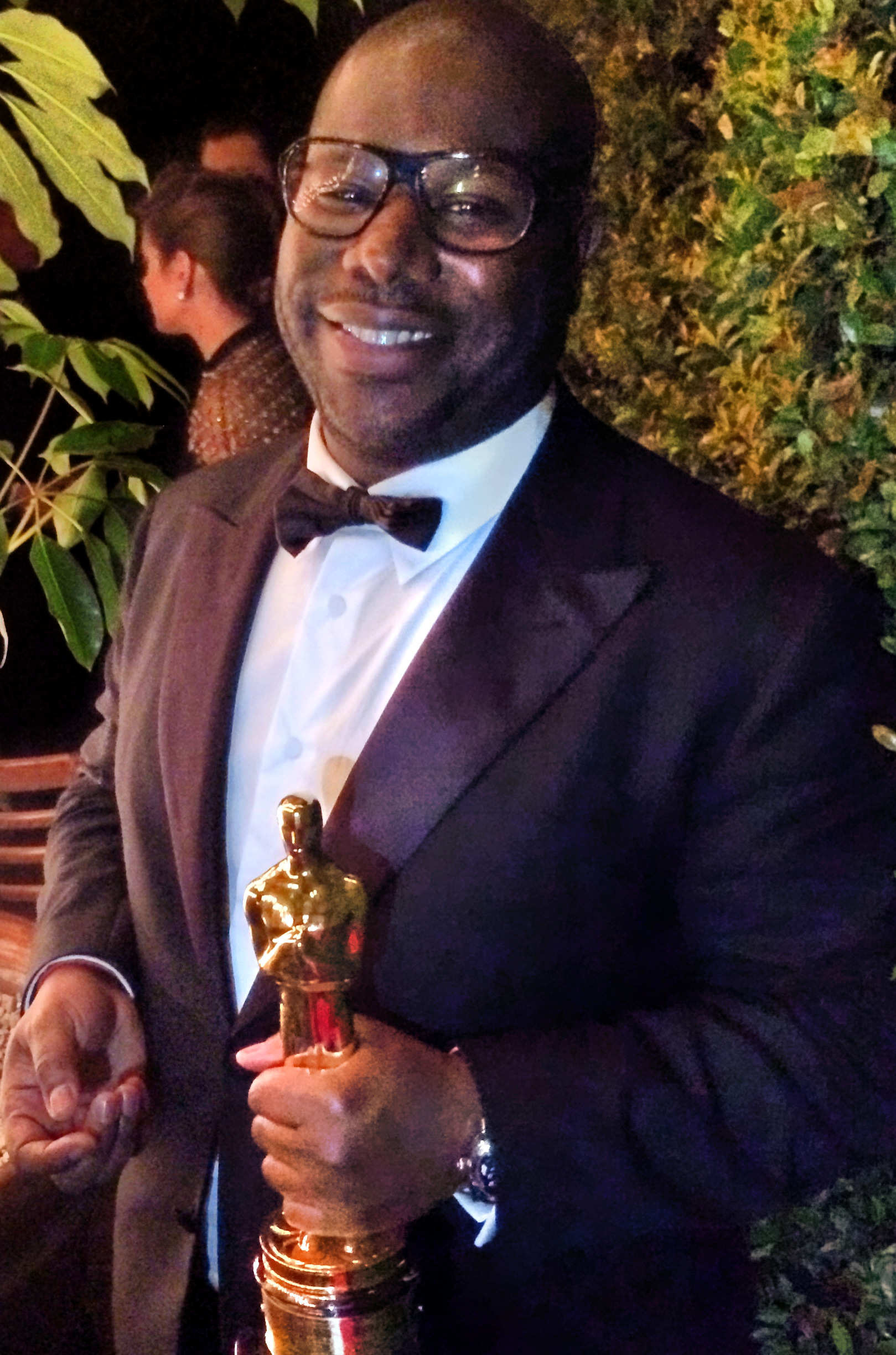
Awards and nominations
Award	Wins	Nominations
Academy Awards	1	2
BAFTA Awards	2	5
Golden Globe Awards	1	2

Totals (Note: Certain award groups do not simply award one winner. They acknowledge several different recipients, have runners-up, and have third place. Since this is a specific recognition and is different from losing an award, runner-up mentions are considered wins in this award tally. For simplification and to avoid errors, each award in this list has been presumed to have had a prior nomination.)
- Wins: 13
- Nominations: 36

The following is a list of awards and nominations received by Steve McQueen.

Steve McQueen is a is British film director, producer, screenwriter, and video artist. He has received several awards including an Academy Award, two BAFTA Awards, a Golden Globe Award, two Independent Spirit Awards, and the Cannes Film Festival's Caméra d'Or.

He is most known for the films, Hunger about the 1981 Irish hunger strike, Shame about sex addiction, 12 Years a Slave (2013) based on the 1853 memoir of the same name, the heist drama Widows (2018), and the World War II drama Blitz (2024). For his work on the 2008 film Hunger, he won a BAFTA Award for Outstanding Debut by a British Writer, Director or Producer, and he won an Academy Award for Best Picture, BAFTA Award for Best Film and a Golden Globe Award for Best Motion Picture – Drama for his work on the 2013 film 12 Years a Slave.

Over the course of his career, McQueen has been honored with the Turner Prize in 1999, the Humanitas Prize in 2011, the BFI Fellowship in 2016 and was knighted by Queen Elizabeth II in 2020 for services to art and film. In 2014, he was included in Time magazine's annual Time 100 list of the "most influential people in the world". In 2021 he was honored by the African-American Film Critics Association. In 2026 he was awarded Erasmus Prize.

== Major awards ==
=== Academy Awards ===
Year	Category	Nominated work	Result	Ref.
2013	Best Picture	12 Years a Slave	Won	
2013	Best Director	12 Years a Slave	Nominated	

Directed Academy Award performances
Under McQueen's direction, these actors have received Academy Award nominations (and one win) for their performances in their respective roles.

Year	Performer	Film	Result
Academy Award for Best Actor
2013	Chiwetel Ejiofor	12 Years a Slave	Nominated
Academy Award for Best Supporting Actor
2013	Michael Fassbender	12 Years a Slave	Nominated
Academy Award for Best Supporting Actress
2013	Lupita Nyong'o	12 Years a Slave	Won

=== BAFTA Awards ===
Year	Category	Nominated work	Result	Ref.
British Academy Film Awards
2008	Outstanding Debut by a British Writer, Director or Producer	Hunger	Won	
2008	Outstanding British Film	Hunger	Nominated	
2011	Outstanding British Film	Shame	Nominated	
2013	Best Film	12 Years a Slave	Won	
2013	Best Direction	12 Years a Slave	Nominated	

=== Golden Globe Awards ===
Year	Category	Nominated work	Result	Ref.
2013	Best Motion Picture – Drama	12 Years a Slave	Won	
2013	Best Director - Motion Picture	12 Years a Slave	Nominated	

== Industry awards ==
Organizations	Year	Category	Work	Result	Ref.
AACTA Award	2013	Best Film	12 Years a Slave	Nominated	
AACTA Award	2013	Best Direction	12 Years a Slave	Nominated	
British Independent Film Awards	2008	Best Director	Hunger	Nominated	
British Independent Film Awards	2008	Best Screenplay	Hunger	Nominated	
British Independent Film Awards	2008	The Douglas Hickox Award	Hunger	Won	
British Independent Film Awards	2011	Best Director	Shame	Nominated	
British Independent Film Awards	2011	Best Screenplay	Shame	Nominated	
Directors Guild of America Award	2013	Outstanding Directing – Feature Film	12 Years a Slave	Nominated	
European Film Award	2008	European Discovery of the Year	Hunger	Won	
European Film Award	2008	Best Director	Hunger	Nominated	
European Film Award	2011	Best Director	Shame	Nominated	
European Film Award	2011	Best Film	Shame	Nominated	
European Film Award	2011	People's Choice Award for Best European Film	Shame	Nominated	
Evening Standard British Film Awards	2008	Best Film	Hunger	Won	
Evening Standard British Film Awards	2011	Best Film	Shame	Nominated	
Independent Spirit Awards	2008	Best Foreign Film	Hunger	Nominated	
Independent Spirit Awards	2011	Best International Film	Shame	Nominated	
Independent Spirit Awards	2013	Best Film	12 Years a Slave	Won	
Independent Spirit Awards	2013	Best Director	12 Years a Slave	Won	
Independent Spirit Awards	2021	Best New Scripted Series	Small Axe	Nominated	
Bodil Awards	2011	Best Non-American Film	Shame	Nominated	
Goya Award	2011	Best European Film	Shame	Nominated	
Nastro d'Argento	2011	Best Director	Shame	Nominated	
National Board of Review	2013	Top Ten Films	12 Years a Slave	Won	
Producers Guild of America	2013	Best Theatrical Motion Picture (tied with Gravity)	12 Years a Slave	Won	
Writers' Guild of Great Britain	2008	Best Screenplay (shared with Enda Walsh)	Hunger	Won	

== Miscellaneous awards ==
Organizations	Year	Category	Work	Result	Ref.
Black Reel Awards	2011	Best Director	Shame	Won	
Black Reel Awards	2011	Best Screenplay, Adapted or Original (shared with Abi Morgan)	Shame	Won	
Black Reel Awards	2013	Best Film	12 Years a Slave	Won	
Black Reel Awards	2013	Best Director	12 Years a Slave	Won	
NAACP Image Awards	2013	Outstanding Motion Picture	12 Years a Slave	Won	
NAACP Image Awards	2013	Outstanding Directing in a Motion Picture	12 Years a Slave	Won	
Satellite Awards	2011	Best Director	Shame	Nominated	
Satellite Awards	2011	Best Original Screenplay	Shame	Nominated	
Satellite Awards	2013	Best Film	12 Years a Slave	Won	
Satellite Awards	2013	Best Director	12 Years a Slave	Won	

== Film critic awards ==
Year	Award	Category	Nominated work	Result
2008	Belgian Film Critics Association	Grand Prix	Hunger	Won
2008	London Film Critics Circle Awards	Breakthrough British Filmmaker	Hunger	Won
2008	Los Angeles Film Critics Association Awards	New Generation Award	Hunger	Won
2008	New York Film Critics Circle Awards	Best First Film	Hunger	Won
2008	Toronto Film Critics Association	Best First Feature	Hunger	Won
2008	Chicago Film Critics Association	Most Promising Filmmaker	Hunger	Nominated
2008	London Film Critics Circle Awards	British Director of the Year	Hunger	Nominated
2008	Online Film Critics Society	Best Breakthrough Filmmaker	Hunger	Nominated
2008	Toronto Film Critics Association	Best Director	Hunger	Nominated
2011	African-American Film Critics Association	Best Director	Shame	Won
2011	Belgian Film Critics Association	Grand Prix	Shame	Nominated
2013	African-American Film Critics Association	Best Film of the Year	12 Years a Slave	Won
2013	African-American Film Critics Association	Best Director	12 Years a Slave	Won
2013	Boston Online Film Critics Association	Top Ten Best Films of the Year	12 Years a Slave	Won
2013	Boston Online Film Critics Association	Best Picture	12 Years a Slave	Won
2013	Boston Online Film Critics Association	Best Director	12 Years a Slave	Won
2013	Boston Society of Film Critics Award	Best Film	12 Years a Slave	Won
2013	Boston Society of Film Critics Award	Best Director	12 Years a Slave	Won
2013	Broadcast Film Critics Association	Best Film	12 Years a Slave	Won
2013	Chicago Film Critics Association	Best Picture	12 Years a Slave	Won
2013	Chicago Film Critics Association	Best Director	12 Years a Slave	Won
2013	Dallas-Fort Worth Film Critics Association	Best Picture	12 Years a Slave	Won
2013	Florida Film Critics Circle Award	Best Film	12 Years a Slave	Won
2013	Florida Film Critics Circle Award	Best Director	12 Years a Slave	Won
2013	Houston Film Critics Society	Best Picture	12 Years a Slave	Won
2013	Indiana Film Critics Association	Best Film	12 Years a Slave	Won
2013	Indiana Film Critics Association	Best Director	12 Years a Slave	Won
2013	Kansas City Film Critics Circle	Best Director	12 Years a Slave	Won
2013	Las Vegas Film Critics Society	Best Film	12 Years a Slave	Won
2013	Las Vegas Film Critics Society	Top Ten Films	12 Years a Slave	Won
2013	Las Vegas Film Critics Society	Best Director	12 Years a Slave	Won
2013	London Film Critics Circle	Film of the Year	12 Years a Slave	Won
2013	Los Angeles Film Critics Association	Special Citation Award	12 Years a Slave	Won
2013	New York Film Critics Circle	Best Director	12 Years a Slave	Won
2013	New York Film Critics Online	Top Films	12 Years a Slave	Won
2013	New York Film Critics Online	Best Picture	12 Years a Slave	Won
2013	Online Film Critics Society	Best Picture	12 Years a Slave	Won
2013	Phoenix Film Critics Society	Best Film	12 Years a Slave	Won
2013	Phoenix Film Critics Society	Top 10 Films	12 Years a Slave	Won
2013	San Francisco Film Critics Circle	Best Film	12 Years a Slave	Won
2013	Southeastern Film Critics Association	Best Picture	12 Years a Slave	Won
2013	Southeastern Film Critics Association	Best Director	12 Years a Slave	Won
2013	St. Louis Film Critics Association	Best Film	12 Years a Slave	Won
2013	St. Louis Film Critics Association	Best Director	12 Years a Slave	Won
2013	St. Louis Film Critics Association	Best Scene	12 Years a Slave	Won
2013	Vancouver Film Critics Circle	Best Film	12 Years a Slave	Won
2013	Washington D.C. Area Film Critics Association	Best Film	12 Years a Slave	Won
2013	Broadcast Film Critics Association	Best Director	12 Years a Slave	Nominated
2013	Dallas-Fort Worth Film Critics Association	Best Director	12 Years a Slave	Runner-up
2013	Detroit Film Critics Society	Best Film	12 Years a Slave	Nominated
2013	Houston Film Critics Society	Best Director	12 Years a Slave	Nominated
2013	London Film Critics Circle	Director of the Year	12 Years a Slave	Nominated
2013	New York Film Critics Circle	Best Film	12 Years a Slave	Runner-up
2013	Online Film Critics Society	Best Director	12 Years a Slave	Nominated
2013	Phoenix Film Critics Society	Best Director	12 Years a Slave	Nominated
2013	San Diego Film Critics Society	Best Film	12 Years a Slave	Nominated
2013	San Diego Film Critics Society	Best Director	12 Years a Slave	Nominated
2013	San Francisco Film Critics Circle	Best Director	12 Years a Slave	Nominated
2013	Toronto Film Critics Association	Best Film	12 Years a Slave	Runner-up
2013	Toronto Film Critics Association	Best Director	12 Years a Slave	Runner-up
2013	Utah Film Critics Association	Best Picture	12 Years a Slave	Runner-up
2013	Utah Film Critics Association	Best Director	12 Years a Slave	Runner-up
2013	Vancouver Film Critics Circle	Best Director	12 Years a Slave	Nominated
2013	Washington D.C. Area Film Critics Association	Best Director	12 Years a Slave	Nominated

== Film festival awards ==
Year	Nominated work	Award	Category	Result
2008	Cannes Film Festival	Caméra d'Or	Hunger	Won
2008	Chicago International Film Festival	Best Feature	Hunger	Won
2008	Cinemanila International Film Festival	Lino Brocka Award for International Cinema	Hunger	Won
2008	Flanders International Film Festival Ghent	Youth Jury Award for Best Film	Hunger	Won
2008	Jerusalem Film Festival	Spirit for Freedom Award for Best Feature	Hunger	Won
2008	Ljubljana International Film Festival	Kingfisher Award for Best Debut	Hunger	Won
2008	Stockholm International Film Festival	Best Directorial Debut	Hunger	Won
2008	Sydney Film Festival	Official Competition Award	Hunger	Won
2008	Tallinn Black Nights Film Festival	Grand Prize for Best Film	Hunger	Won
2008	Toronto International Film Festival	Discovery Award for Best Film	Hunger	Won
2008	Venice Film Festival	Gucci Award for Best Film	Hunger	Won
2008	Stockholm International Film Festival	Bronze Horse for Best Film	Hunger	Nominated
2011	Venice International Film Festival	CinemAvvenire Award for Best Film	Shame	Won
2011	Venice International Film Festival	FIPRESCI Prize for Best Film	Shame	Won
2011	BFI London Film Festival	Best Film	Shame	Nominated
2011	Stockholm Film Festival	Bronze Horse Award for Best Film	Shame	Nominated
2011	Venice Film Festival	Golden Lion	Shame	Nominated
2013	Palm Springs International Film Festival	Director of the Year Award	12 Years a Slave	Won
2013	Stockholm International Film Festival	Bronze Horse Award for Best Film	12 Years a Slave	Won
2013	Toronto International Film Festival	People's Choice Award	12 Years a Slave	Won

== Honorary awards ==
Organizations	Year	Award	Result	Ref.
Turner Prize	1999	For his video work	Honored	
Humanitas Prize	2011	For his filmwork	Honored	
British Film Institute	2016	BFI Fellowship	Honored	
Knighthood	2020	Presented by Queen Elizabeth II	Honored	
Hollywood Critics Association	2021	Filmmaking Achievement	Honored	
African-American Film Critics Association	2021	Special Achievement Game Changer Award for Small Axe	Honored	

== Honorary Doctorate ==
In October 2024, McQueen was awarded an honorary doctorate from the University of Amsterdam together with Bianca Stigter for bringing "major social issues and political and historical themes to the attention of a large audience".
