= Bass (exhibition) =

Steve McQueen exhibition

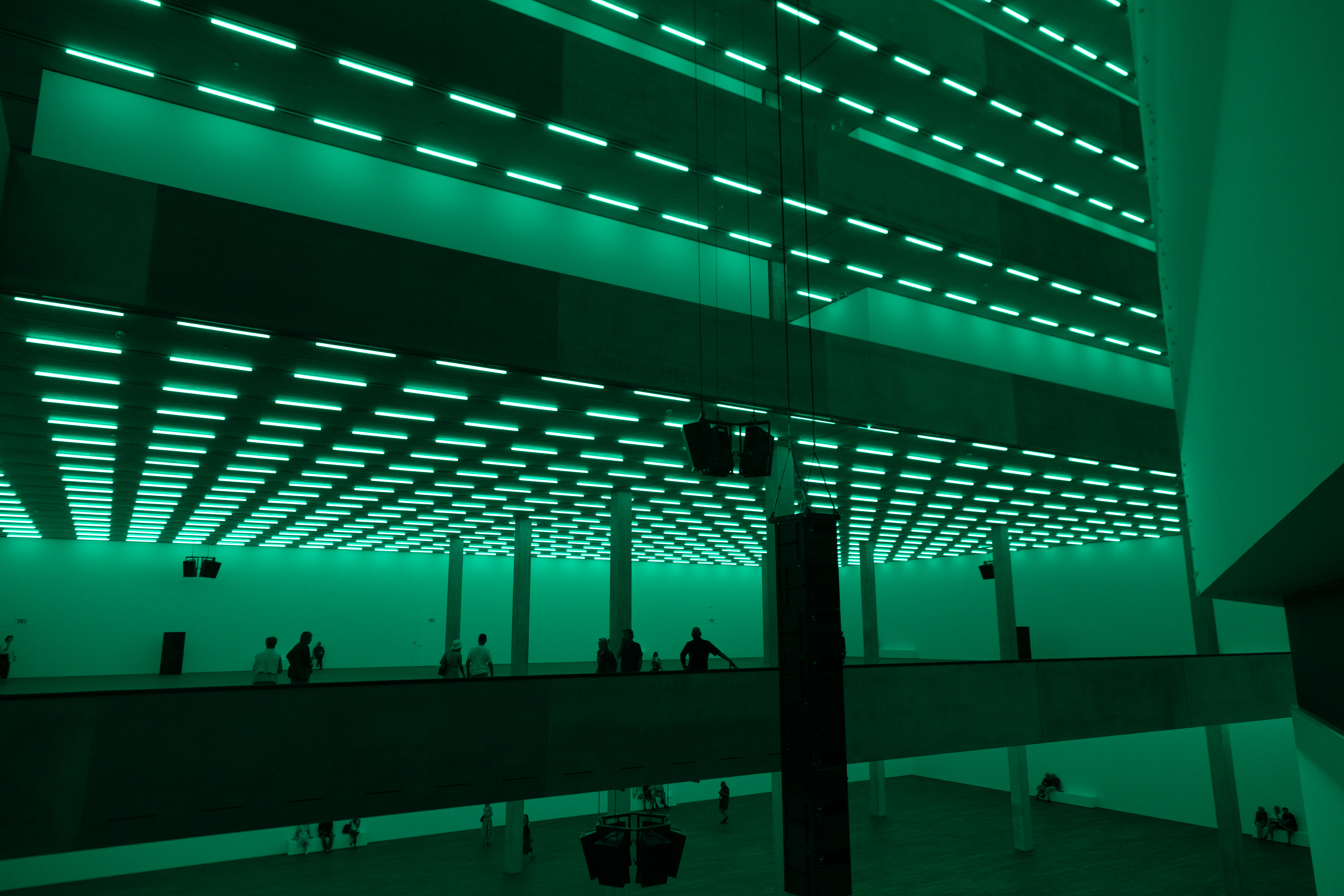
Bass at the Schaulager in 2025.

Bass is an exhibition by filmmaker and artist Steve McQueen. An installation of mounted lights shifting through the color spectrum while a bass-driven soundtrack plays, it originally showed at the Dia Beacon in 2024 before moving to the Schaulager in Münchenstein, Switzerland. The soundtrack was composed by bassists Marcus Miller, Meshell Ndegeocello, Aston Barrett Jr., Mamadou Kouyaté, and Laura-Simone Martin.

== History ==
In 2024, Bass debuted at the Dia Beacon's 30,000-square-foot basement on May 12. There, "sixty ceiling-mounted LED lightboxes and three stacks of speakers" were installed, with a caution to patrons that the piece involves "no moving-image component." While largely an open-ended, spatial work, it has an approximately 40-minute runtime in terms of its shifts in light and sound.

Bass was a co-commissioned project by the Dia Art Foundation, the Laurenz Foundation, and the Schaulager. Its soundtrack, by bassists Marcus Miller, Meshell Ndegeocello, Aston Barrett Jr., Mamadou Kouyaté, and Laura-Simone Martin, was a collectively improvised performance involving one different bass instrument per player; they recorded it across two days, ultimately producing a three-hour cut, while in the Bass space.

In 2025, Bass was moved to and installed in the Schaulager and was scheduled to show from June 16 to November 16.

== Themes ==
In imagining Bass, McQueen was inspired by the history of the Middle Passage and sought to create a work around "the whole idea of limbo and not being here or there." He was specifically drawn to the forms of light and sound as "they are both created through movement and fluidity... They can be molded into any shape, like vapor or a scent; they can sneak into any nook and cranny."

== Critical reception ==
Hyperallergic called Bass an abstract work completely open to interpretation, with no "heuristic center," and lamented that it seemed much too ambitious yet all too vague for its conceptual grounding in the Middle Passage.

The Guardian gave it five stars out of five, calling McQueen "one of the best artists we have, whatever medium he chooses" and admiring Bass' ability to capture the longstanding history of bass in West African music and its continuity through the Middle Passage and into the New World.

Flash Art dubbed it "McQueen's most abstract work yet, to be sure... it asks its inhabitants to reside in the throbs, hollows, and surges of a life lived in the wake," with "the wake" referring specifically to Christina Sharpe's In the Wake: On Blackness and Being.

The New York Times called it one of McQueen's most "fertile" works despite its abstracted basis: "You can bring your own thoughts and find your own inspiration. That's the power of abstraction, of course."

Mubi's Notebook likened Bass' experience to that of the protagonist in Invisible Man by Ralph Ellison, as well as lauded its deconstructed approach to cinema as a reflection of the impossibility of trying to visually capture the Black lived experience, or at least to do so without violent spectacle.

== Publications ==
The Laurenz Foundation and Dia Art Foundation published Steve McQueen. Bass as an accompanying publication to the 2024 exhibition. Another publication, focused on Bass' installation at the Schaulager, followed in 2025.
