= Pierre Bernard (graphic designer) =

French graphic artist and designer

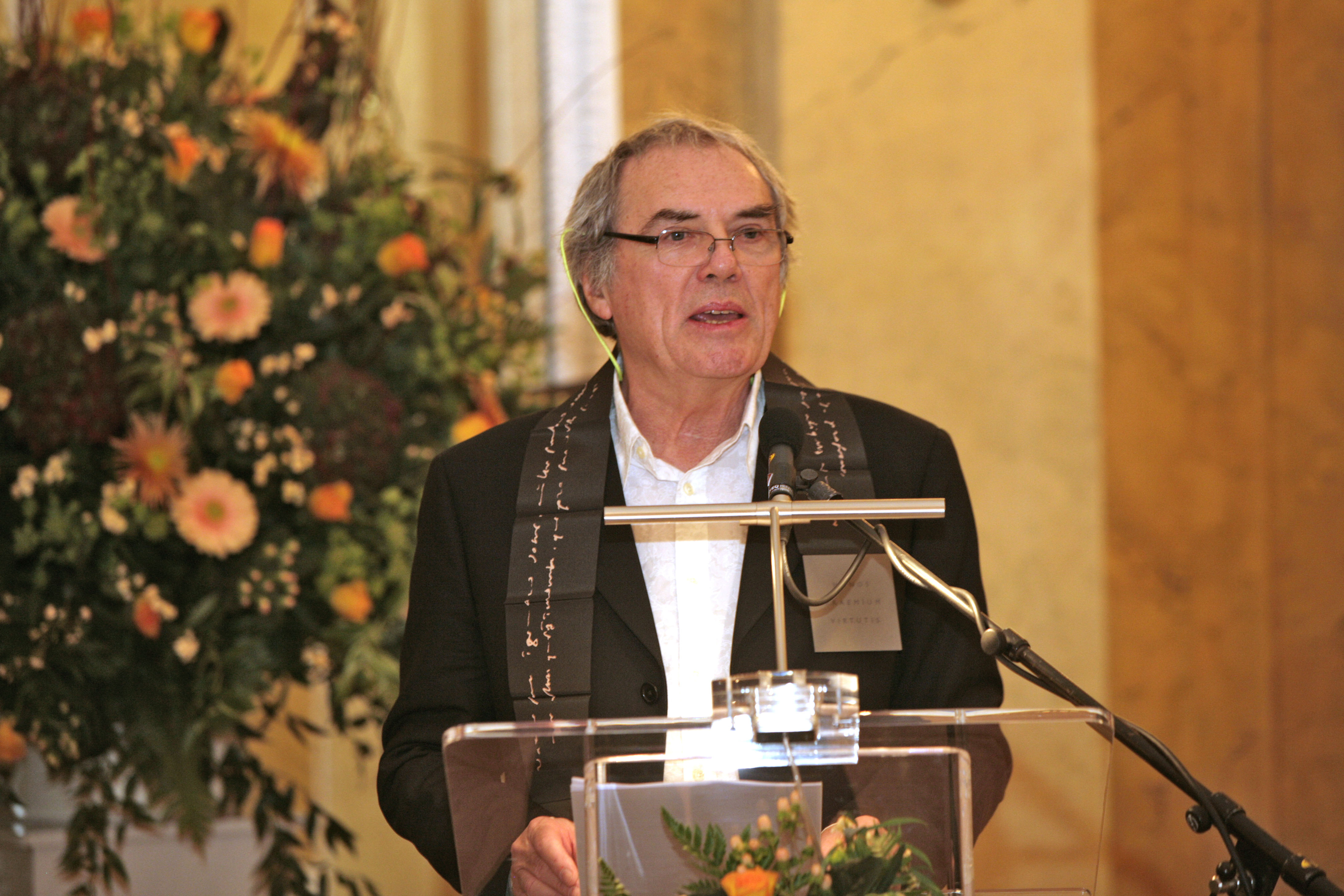
- Pierre Bernard (2006)
- Born: 25 February 1942; Paris, France
- Died: 23 November 2015 (aged 73); Paris, France
- Known for: design
- Awards: Erasmus Prize

Pierre Bernard (25 February 1942 – 23 November 2015) was a French graphic artist and designer. He was a member and then the manager for the L’Atelier Création Graphique in Paris, an organization he founded along with Dirk Behage and Fokke Draaijer. He was the recipient of the 2006 Erasmus Prize.

In 1970, Pierre Bernard founded Grapus with François Miehe and Gérard Paris-Clavel met during the student strike in May 1968. All three were members of the French Communist Party. Alex Jordan and Jean-Paul Bachollet joined the collective in 1976.

Bernard has been a member of the Alliance Graphique Internationale since 1987. He was a notable graphic design teacher at the École nationale supérieure des arts décoratifs (ENSAD) in Paris. Bernard's status as a graphic designer equals that of graphic artists such as Niklaus Troxler and Werner Jekerof of Switzerland and Eiko Ishioka of Japan.

== Publications ==
- Pierre Bernard. Design for the public domain. Erasmus Prize 2006. (Publ. in English, French & Dutch). Amsterdam, Praemium Erasmianum Foundation, 2007. ISBN 978-90-77973-04-2
- Hugues Boekraad: Mijn werk is niet mijn werk. Pierre Bernard. Ontwerpen voor het publieke domein. Baden, Müller, 2007. ISBN 978-3-03778-104-3
- Pierre di Sciullo. Expériences graphiques et typographiques. By Pierre Bernard, Muriel Paris, Pierre di Sciullo et al. Nuth, Rosbeek, 1995. No ISBN
- 27 voeux pour 1991. Par Pierre Bernard, Dirk Behage et Fokke Draaijer. Paris, Gerfau & l'Atelier de Création Graphique-Grapus, 1991. No ISBN
