= Steve McQueen (director) =

British film director and video artist (born 1969)

Sir Steve McQueen CBE
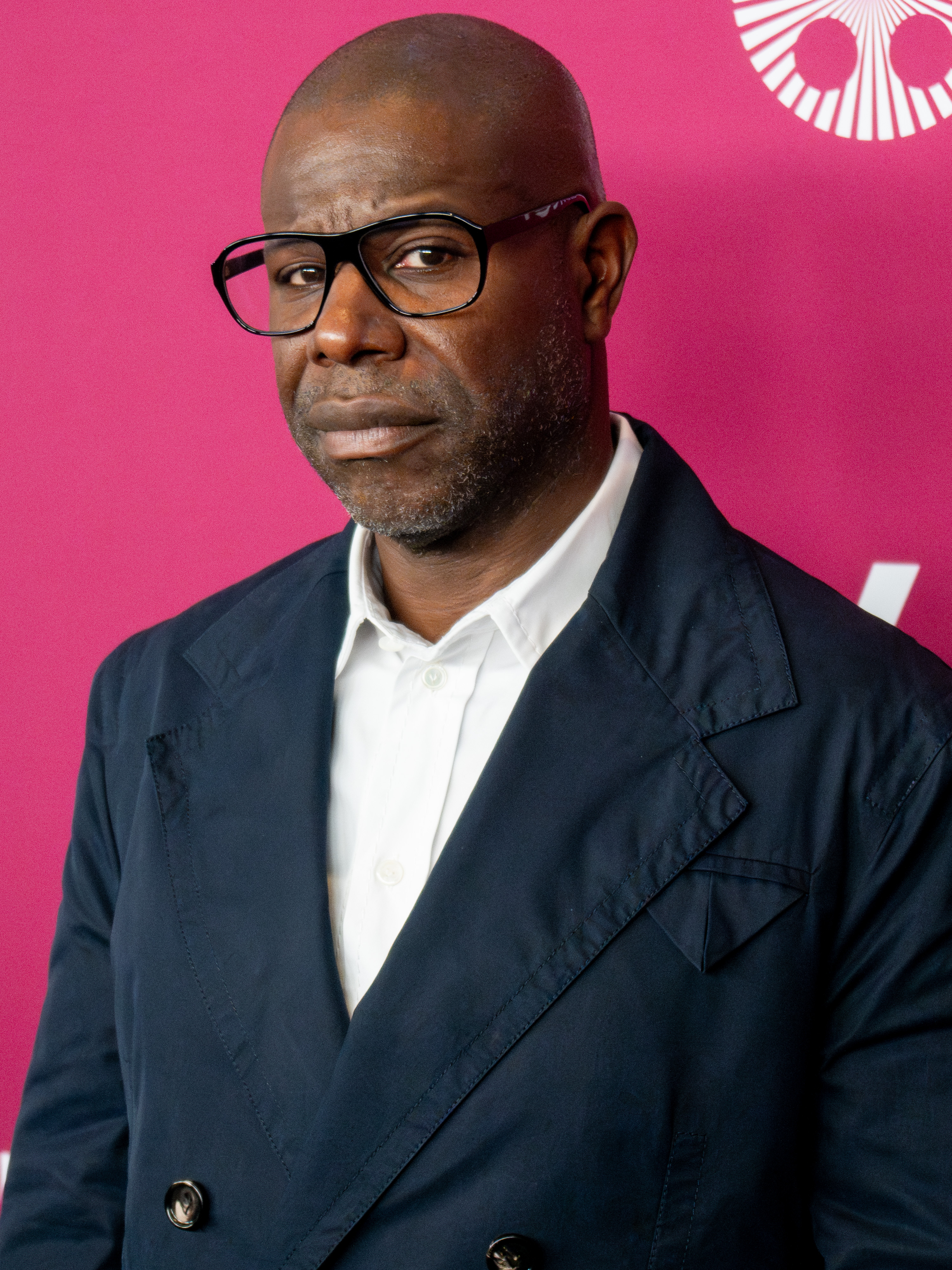
- McQueen at the 2024 New York Film Festival
- Born: 9 October 1969 (age 57); London, England
- Education: Chelsea College of Arts; Goldsmiths (BFA)
- Occupations: Film director; film producer; screenwriter; video artist
- Years active: 1993–present
- Style: Neo-noir; experimental; social realism
- Spouse: Bianca Stigter
- Children: 2
- Awards: Full list

Sir Steve Rodney McQueen (born 9 October 1969) is a British film director, film producer, screenwriter and video artist. He has received several awards including an Academy Award, two BAFTA Awards and a Golden Globe Award. He was awarded the Turner Prize in 1999; the BFI Fellowship in 2016; and was knighted by Queen Elizabeth II in 2020 for services to art and film. In 2014, he was included in Time magazine's annual Time 100 list of the "most influential people in the world".

McQueen made his feature-length directorial film debut with the historical drama Hunger (2008), which focused on the 1981 Irish hunger strike, followed by the erotic psychological drama Shame (2011), which explored sex addiction. He won the Academy Award for Best Picture for producing the historical drama 12 Years a Slave (2013), which he directed. He also directed the contemporary crime thriller Widows (2018), and the World War II drama Blitz (2024).

For television, McQueen released Small Axe (2020), a collection of five anthology films "set within London's West Indian community from the late 1960s to the early '80s". He also directed the BBC documentary series Uprising (2021) and the documentary film Occupied City (2023).

== Early life and education ==
McQueen was born in London on 9 October 1969, to a Grenadian father and a Trinidadian mother. The names of these parents were Julia and William, both of whom had migrated to England. He grew up in Ealing, West London. McQueen was a keen football player, turning out for the West London youth football team St. George's Colts.

McQueen attended Drayton Manor High School. In a 2014 interview, he stated that he had a very bad experience in school, where he had been placed into a class for students believed best suited "for manual labour, more plumbers and builders, stuff like that". He said that, 15 years later, when he returned to present some achievement awards, the new head of the school claimed that there had been institutional racism at the time. McQueen added that he was dyslexic and had to wear an eyepatch because of a lazy eye, and reflected this might be why he had been "put to one side very quickly".

McQueen took A-level Art at Ealing, Hammersmith and West London College. He went on to study Art and Design at Chelsea College of Arts, mainly working in painting. Later, he studied Fine Art at Goldsmiths College, University of London, where he first became interested in film. Influenced by Jean Vigo, Jean-Luc Godard, François Truffaut, Ingmar Bergman, and Andy Warhol, McQueen started making short films. He left Goldsmiths and studied briefly at New York University's Tisch School of the Arts. He found the approach there too stifling and insufficiently experimental, complaining that "they wouldn't let you throw the camera up in the air".

McQueen's artistic influences include Andy Warhol, Sergei Eisenstein, Dziga Vertov, Jean Vigo, Buster Keaton, Carl Theodor Dreyer, Robert Bresson, and Billy Wilder.

== Career ==
=== 1990–2007: Short films and visual art ===
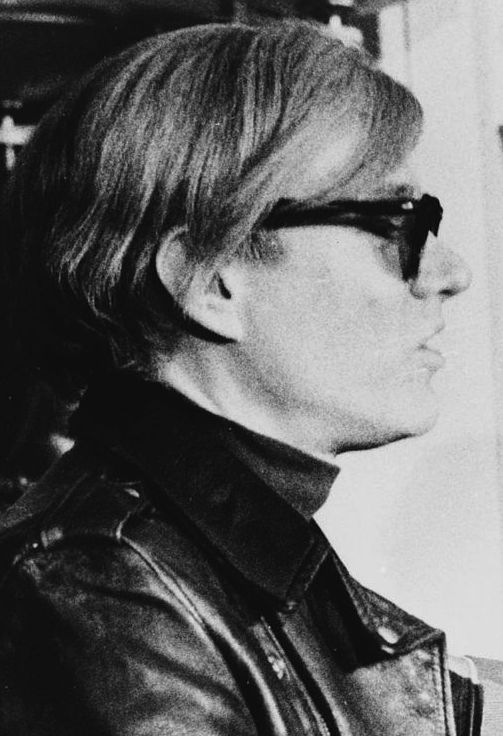
McQueen has cited Andy Warhol as an influence on his work.

McQueen's films as an artist were typically projected onto one or more walls of an enclosed space in an white cube gallery, and often in black-and-white and minimalistic. He has cited the influence of the Nouvelle Vague and the films of Andy Warhol. He often appeared in the films himself.

In 1995, McQueen met the art curator Okwui Enwezor at the Institute of Contemporary Arts, London. Enwezor became a mentor to him as well as a friend and had a significant influence on McQueen's work.

McQueen's first major work was Bear (1993), in which two naked men (one of them McQueen) exchange a series of glances that might be taken to be flirtatious or threatening. Another early work, Deadpan (1997) is a restaging of a Buster Keaton stunt in which a house collapses around McQueen, who is left unscathed because he is standing where there is a missing window. As well as being in black-and-white, both these films are silent.

The first of McQueen's films to use sound was also the first to use a multiple-camera setup: Drumroll (1998). This was made with three cameras, two mounted to the sides, and one to the front of an oil drum, which McQueen rolled through the streets of Manhattan. The resulting films were projected on three walls of an enclosed space.

During this time, McQueen also made sculptures such as White Elephant (1998), as well as photographs.

In 1999, McQueen won the Turner Prize for the "range" and "emotional intensity" of his art. However, much of the publicity went to Tracey Emin, who was also a nominee.

In 2006, McQueen went to Iraq as an official war artist commissioned by the Imperial War Museum. The following year, he presented the work Queen and Country (2007), which commemorated the British soldiers killed in the Iraq War by presenting their portraits as sheets of stamps. A proposal to have the stamps placed in circulation was rejected by the Royal Mail.

His 2007, McQueen's short film Gravesend depicted the process of coltan refinement and production. It premiered at the Renaissance Society in the United States.

=== 2008–2018: Breakthrough as filmmaker ===
==== Hunger (2008) ====
In 2008, McQueen's first feature-length film Hunger, about the 1981 Irish hunger strike, premiered at the Cannes Film Festival.

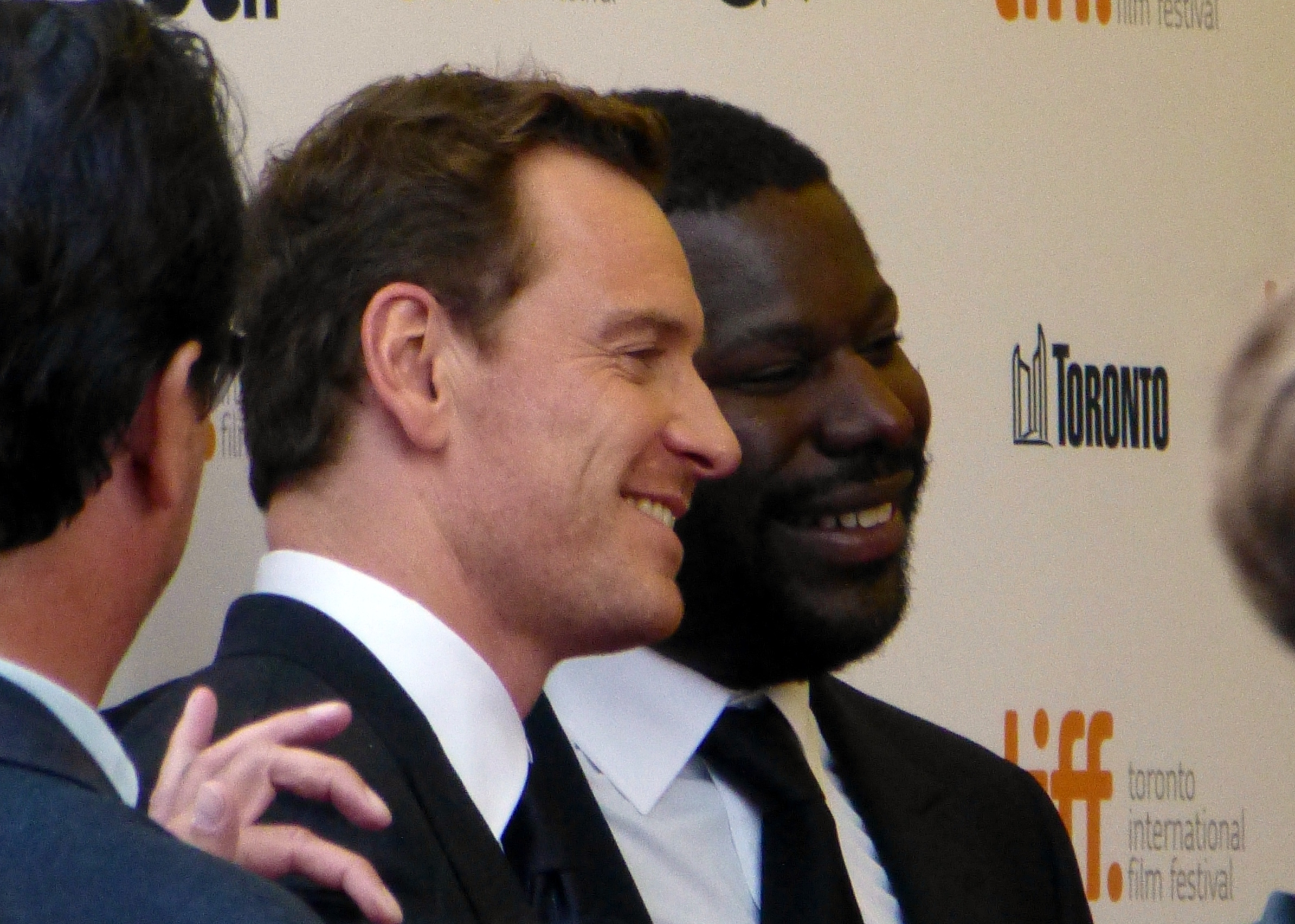
McQueen and Michael Fassbender (pictured in 2013) have frequently collaborated on films, starting with Hunger (2008).

McQueen won the Caméra d'Or (first-time director) Award at Cannes, the first British director to win the award. The film also won several awards including:

- The inaugural Sydney Film Festival Prize for "its controlled clarity of vision, its extraordinary detail and bravery, the dedication of its cast and the power and resonance of its humanity".
- The 2008 Diesel Discovery Award at the Toronto International Film Festival, which is voted on by the press attending the festival.
- The Los Angeles Film Critics Association award for a New Generation film in 2008.
- The best film prize at the London Evening Standard Film Awards in 2009.

==== Venice Biennale 2009 ====
McQueen represented Britain at the 2009 Venice Biennale.

Also in 2009, it was announced that McQueen had been tapped to direct Fela, a biopic about the Nigerian musician and activist Fela Kuti; however, by 2014, the proposal was no longer produced under Focus Features, and while he maintained his role as the main writer, McQueen was replaced by Andrew Dosunmu as the director. McQueen told The Hollywood Reporter that the film was "dead".

==== Shame (2011) ====
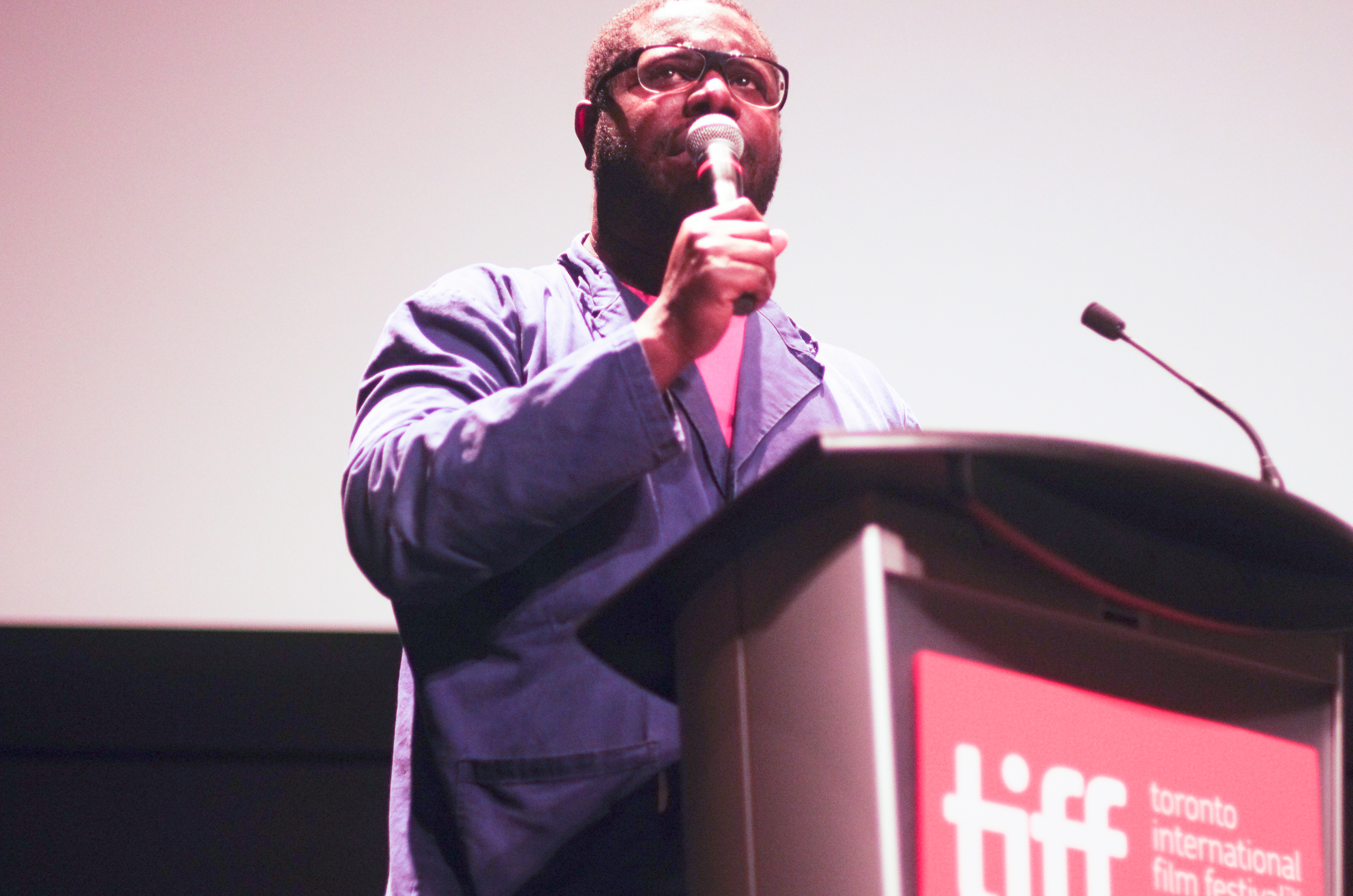
McQueen at a Q&A discussion for his film Shame at the TIFF in 2011

In 2011, McQueen's second major theatrical film Shame was released. Set in New York City, it stars Michael Fassbender as a sex addict whose life is suddenly turned upside-down when his estranged sister (Carey Mulligan) reappears.

The film was premiered at the Venice Film Festival and was shown at the New York Film Festival and the Toronto Film Festival.

The film received critical acclaim, with Roger Ebert of Chicago Sun-Times giving the film four out of four stars and describing it as "a powerful film" and "courageous and truthful", commenting that "this is a great act of filmmaking and acting. I don't believe I would be able to see it twice." Ebert would later name it his second best film of 2011. Todd McCarthy of The Hollywood Reporter gave the film a positive review, stating: "Driven by a brilliant, ferocious performance by Michael Fassbender, Shame is a real walk on the wild side, a scorching look at a case of sexual addiction that's as all-encompassing as a craving for drugs."

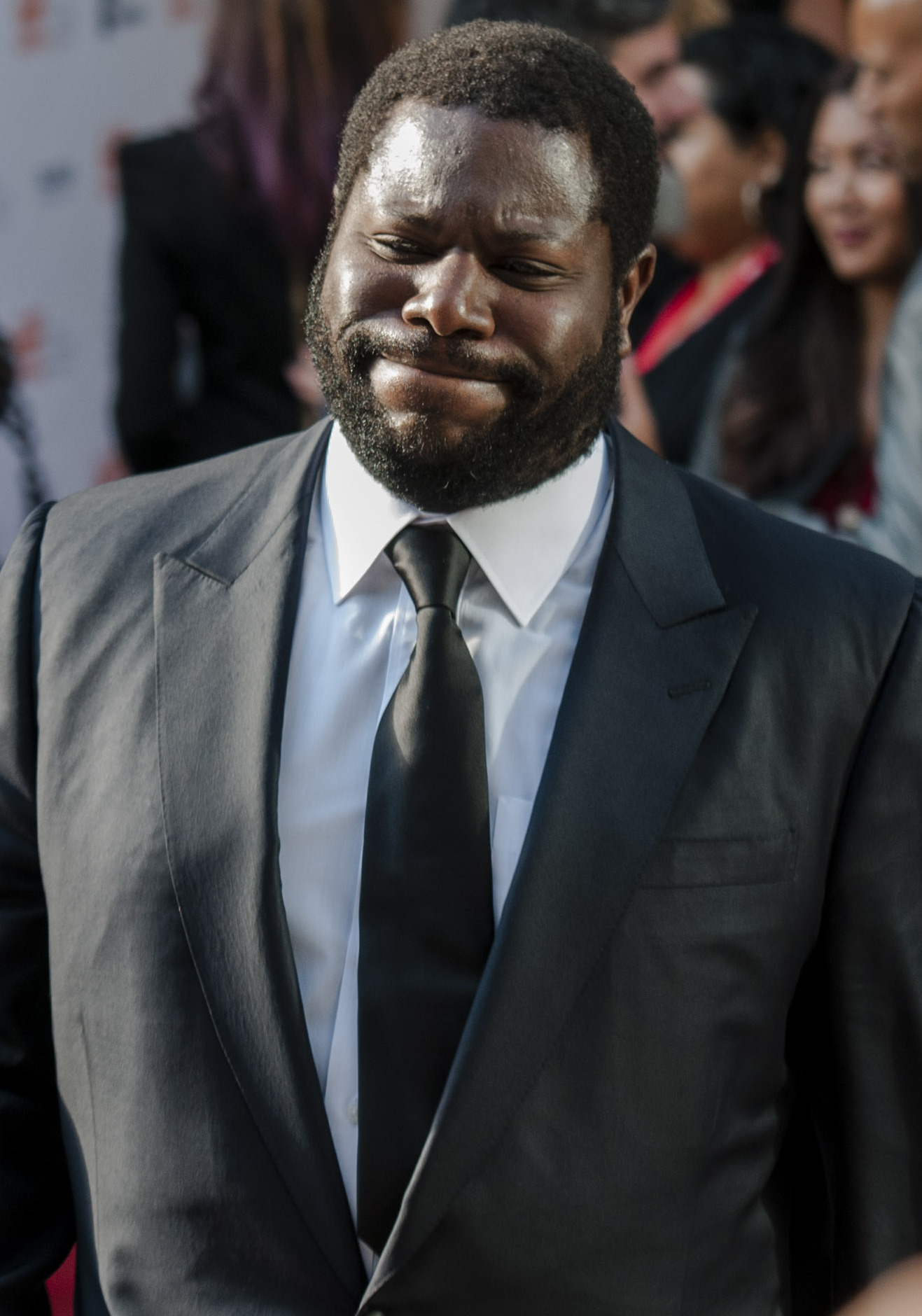
McQueen at the premiere of 12 Years a Slave at the 2013 Toronto International Film Festival

==== 12 Years a Slave (2013) ====
McQueen's next film was 12 Years a Slave (2013). Based on the 1853 autobiography of the same name by Solomon Northup, the film tells the story of a free black man who is kidnapped in 1841 and sold into slavery, working on plantations in the state of Louisiana for twelve years before being released. On the process of making 12 Years a Slave, actor and producer Brad Pitt stated: "Steve was the first to ask the big question, 'Why has there not been more films on the American history of slavery?'. And it was the big question it took a Brit to ask."

The film won the Academy Award for Best Picture in March 2014, becoming the first Best Picture winner to have a black director or producer. The film also won a supporting actress Oscar for Lupita Nyong'o.

==== 2012–2018 ====
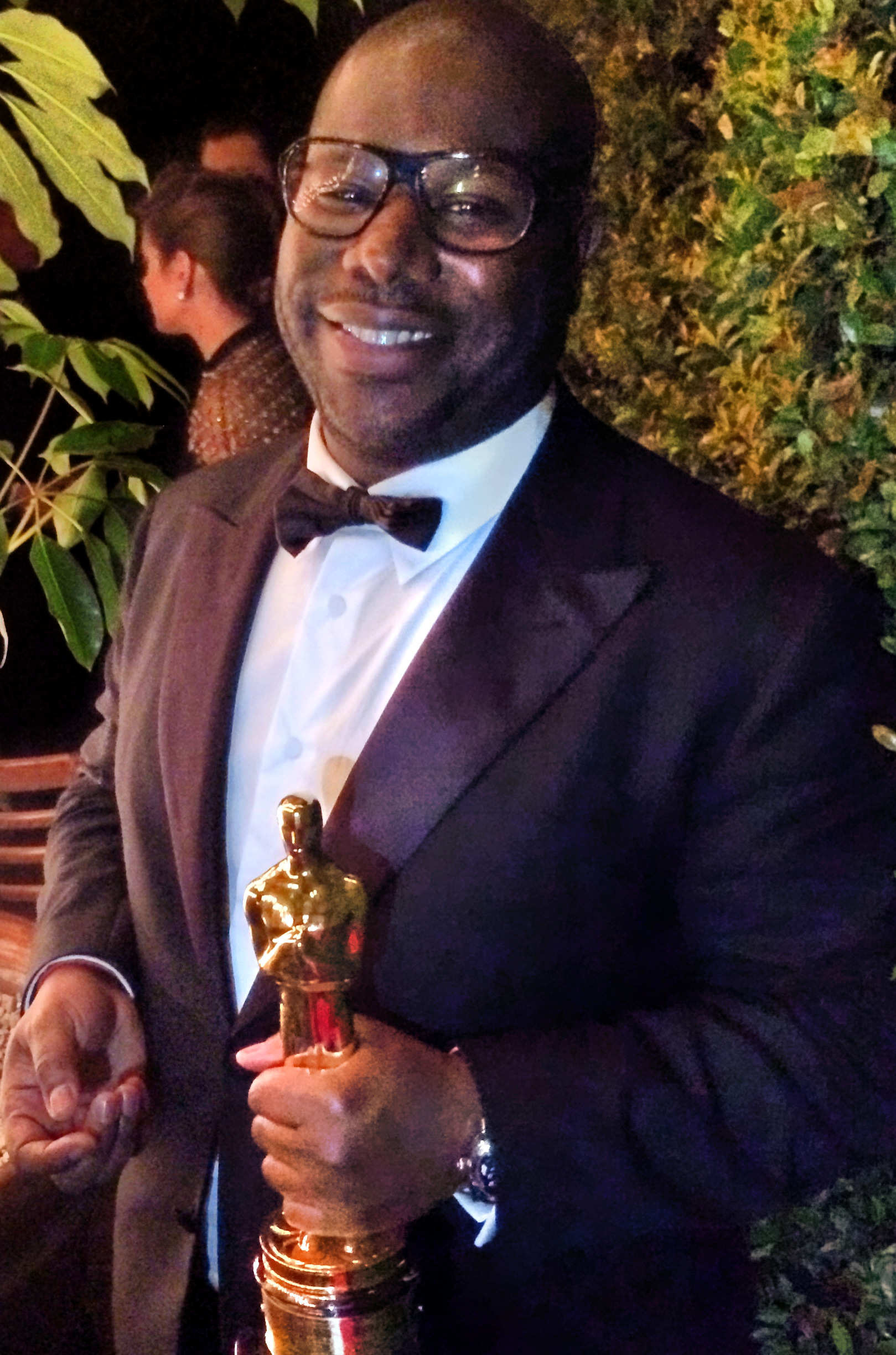
McQueen holding his Academy Award for Best Picture in March 2014

In 2012, McQueen debuted a new artistic installation End Credits, which focused on the political persecution of Paul Robeson, with more than 10 hours each of video footage and audio recordings, unsynced. It has been exhibited at a number of locations including the Art Institute of Chicago, Whitney Museum of American Art in New York City, Perez Art Museum (Miami), and International Performing Arts festival in Amsterdam (June 2019).

In 2013, McQueen signed on to develop Codes of Conduct, a six-episode limited series for HBO. However, after the pilot episode was shot, HBO shut down production. He also worked on a BBC drama about the lives of black Britons, which follows a group of friends and their families from 1968 to 2014.

In 2014, McQueen announced plans to do a feature film on Robeson with Harry Belafonte.

In 2015, McQueen shot the video for Kanye West's single "All Day". The film was screened at Fondation Louis Vuitton in Paris on 7 March 2015 before the first concert of a four-night residency by the American artist, at the Frank Gehry-designed building, began. The film subsequently received its American premiere at the Los Angeles County Museum of Art in July 2015.

In 2018, McQueen directed Widows, which was co-written with Gone Girl writer Gillian Flynn and based on the 1983 British series of the same name. Viola Davis starred in the heist thriller about four armed robbers who are killed in a failed heist attempt, only to have their widows step up to finish the job. He also directed a one-minute commercial for Chanel's men fragrance Bleu de Chanel starring Gaspard Ulliel.

=== 2019–present ===
==== Year 3 (2019) ====
In 2019, McQueen created the photographic project Year 3. It displayed class portraits of almost every London schoolchild in Year 3 (more than 3000 images) at Tate Britain in London. The photographs were also displayed on billboards across the city. McQueen said he did this project to show people "how uneven the playing field already is...you can see the disparities in resources, opportunities and circumstances that will shape these young lives" and in doing so, showing them "the future of London".

==== Small Axe (2020) ====
In 2019, it was announced that Small Axe, an anthology series of five films created and directed by McQueen, would be released on BBC One and Amazon Prime Video. Some form of the series had been in development since 2012, and was first announced in 2014. The series focuses on "five stories set within London's West Indian community from the late 1960s to the early '80s". The series was released weekly on BBC One and Amazon Prime Video starting in November 2020.

The anthology was a particularly personal project for McQueen, as it portrays the larger community that he grew up in. They are films he felt should have been made "35 years ago, 25 years ago, but they weren't".

There's no way anyone would have given me – or anybody else – any money at that time to make a film about the Mangrove Nine. You were not welcome... A lot of people said to me: "Why did you not do this at the beginning of your film career?" But I couldn't have because I didn't have the maturity then, I didn't have the distance, I didn't have the strength. I needed to do other things before I could come back to me.

— McQueen in an interview with David Olusoga in Sight & Sound

To close the Anthology, McQueen chose to base the final film, Education, on a story from his own life.

Three films in the series premiered at the New York Film Festival, receiving critical acclaim. Both Mangrove and Lovers Rock were selected for Cannes in 2020, and had the festival not been cancelled due to the COVID-19 pandemic, McQueen would have been the first director to have two films in competition in Cannes in the same year.

The anthology, particularly the films Mangrove and Lovers Rock, received numerous accolades and appeared on several critics' top ten lists. Lovers Rock was the top-ranked film in Sight and Sound's best films of 2020, an aggregation of top 10 lists by the magazine's contributors.

==== Occupied City (2023) ====
According to Film Stage, Jordan Raup reported that McQueen would direct a WWII documentary titled Occupied City dealing with the occupation of Amsterdam by German forces between 1940 and 1945. It premiered at the 2023 Cannes Film Festival.

==== Grenfell (2023) ====
McQueen's made his short film Grenfell on the topic of the Grenfell Tower fire, a fatal fire in 2017. It is dedicated to the 72 people who lost their lives in the fire, as well as the survivors and bereaved.

The film was a self-funded project. McQueen has chosen not to speak much about the film to ensure that the focus remains on the tragedy. From 2025-2027, the film is touring public art institutions across the UK, including: Tramway, Glasgow; Chapter, Cardiff; MAC, Belfast; the Box, Plymouth; Tate Liverpool; and MAC, Birmingham.

==== Blitz (2024) ====
He returned to feature filmmaking with Blitz, a story about Londoners during The Blitz of World War II, which he wrote, directed and produced. It focuses on a child caught up in the war.

On 9 October 2024, Blitz received its world premiere as the BFI London Film Festival's opening film. On 22 October 2024, it was screened at the Chicago International Film Festival. It was scheduled for release in select cinemas in the United Kingdom and United States on 1 November 2024, followed by a streaming release on Apple TV+ on 22 November 2024.

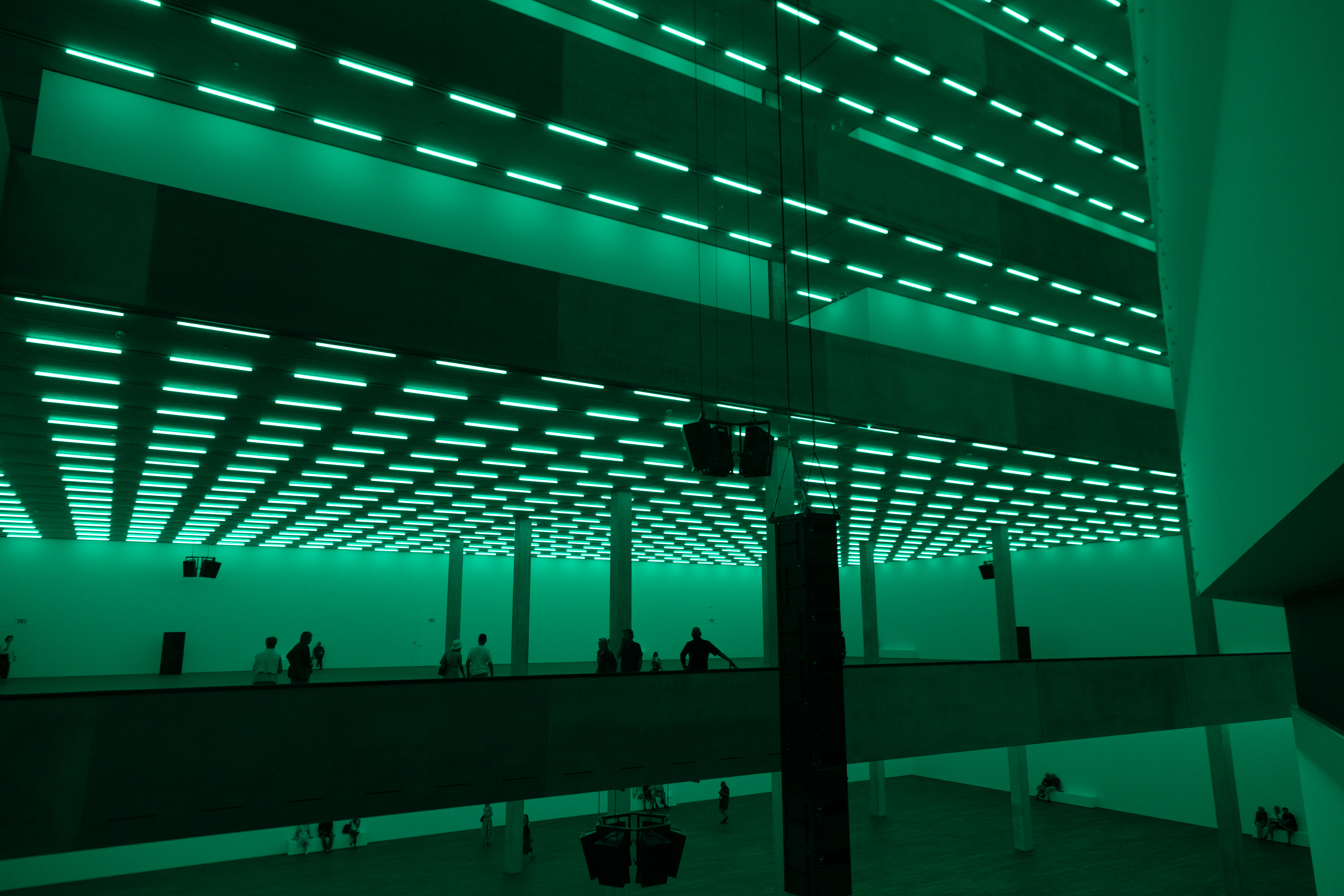
Bass at Schaulager in Basel, Switzerland

Also in 2024, McQueen debuted an exhibition of light and sound, titled Bass, at the Dia Beacon. It was moved to the Schaulager in 2025.

In 2025, McQueen co-curated (with Clairie Wallis) the exhibition Resistance at Turner Contemporary, in Margate. It looked at the history of resistance through 100 years of photography (1903–2003). The project took extensive research over four years to put together.

== Experimental and short films ==
Bear (1993) was McQueen's first major film, presented at the Royal College of Art in London. Although not an overtly political piece, for many it raised questions about race, sexual attraction to men, and violence. It shows a wrestling match between two men who alternate ambiguous relations and gestures of aggression and erotic attraction. Like all McQueen's early films, Bear is black-and-white, and was shot on 16-millimetre film. It was featured in a two-part film exhibition at the Smithsonian Institution Hirshhorn Museum and Sculpture Garden in Washington, D.C.

Five Easy Pieces (1995) is a short film by McQueen. It follows a woman across a tight-rope; McQueen has stated that he finds a tight-rope walker to be "the perfect image of a combination of vulnerability and strength".

Just Above My Head (1996) is a short film which shares close ties with McQueen's preceding film with the key theme of walking. A man – played by McQueen – is shot in a way so as to crop out his body, but his head appears small at the bottom of the image, rising and falling with his step and coming in and out of frame according to the movement of the camera. As stated by David Frankel, the "simultaneous fragility and persistence" is seemingly meant as a metaphor for black life in England as elsewhere.

Deadpan (1997) is a four-minute black-and-white short film directed by and starring McQueen showing a multitude of angles on a re-enactment of a stunt from Buster Keaton's silent comedy film Steamboat Bill, Jr. (1928). Frieze Magazine noted his lack of shoelaces and inferred a multitude of depth and commentary on the prison system. Media Art noted that his use of black and white emulates 1920s film style without "a historicizing strategy or to reinterpret the origins of moving images". The film was exhibited on loop in the Museum of Modern Art's Contemporary Galleries, 1980-Now from 17 November 2011 to 17 February 2014.

Exodus (1997) is a 65-second colour video that takes the title of a record by Bob Marley as its starting point. It records a found event, two black men carrying potted palms whom McQueen followed down a London street, the greenery waving precariously above their heads. Then they get on a bus and leave.

Caribs' Leap/Western Deep (2002), two complementary shorts, were commissioned for documenta 11. Carib's Leap explores an event in the Caribbean island of Grenada when, in 1651, the last remaining community of Caribs, resisting French colonialism, chose to leap to their death. Western Deep is a powerful exploration of the sensory experience of the TauTona Gold Mine in South Africa, showing migrant labourers working in dark, claustrophobic environments and the ear-splitting noise of drilling.

Pursuit (Version 2) (2005), a 16mm film transferred to video as a front- and rear-projected mirror installation on three walls, is a 14-minute film selected for the Sharjah Biennial 15: Thinking Historically in the Present. The work originally premiered at the Fondazione Prada, Milan in 2005. Consisting of a sound and video installation with mirrored walls, the imagery is difficult to discern in the chaotic, low-light setting which has been described as disorienting and kaleidoscopic.

Running Thunder (2007), an 11-minute short film of a dead horse in a meadow. It was bought by the Stedelijk Museum in Amsterdam in 2014.

Ashes (2002–2015) is a two-channel video installation composed of 8mm and 16mm footage filmed by McQueen over ten years, on two separate visits, to the Caribbean island of Grenada. It focused on a young man he met there called Ashes. McQueen, along with his cinematographer Robby Müller, first met and filmed Ashes in 2002 while filming on Grenada for Carib's Leap, but the footage of Ashes afloat on the prow of a boat went unused. After learning in 2013 that Ashes was murdered by drug dealers, McQueen returned to Grenada to film his burial. Shown back-to-back on a single screen, the final installation juxtaposes vibrant footage of Ashes' life and his untimely death. The soundscape of each film, playing simultaneously, features the calming sounds of water contrasted with the sounds of the tomb construction, and overlapped with the narration of a friend explaining why Ashes was murdered. McQueen has remarked: "Life and death have always lived side by side, in every aspect of life. We live with ghosts in our everyday."

== Personal life ==
McQueen is married to Bianca Stigter, a Dutch cultural critic, with whom he has a daughter and a son, Alex and Dexter. Since 1997, the McQueens have kept a home in Amsterdam, in addition to their home in London.

McQueen was a fan of English football club Tottenham Hotspur, but said in 2014: "I gave up football. It affected my day too much. It's just stupid."

== Political views ==
In 2014, McQueen criticised the film industry for ignoring American slavery and the Atlantic slave trade, saying that World War II "lasted five years and there are hundreds and hundreds of films about the second world war and the Holocaust. Slavery lasted 400 years and there are less than 20 [films]."

In June 2020, McQueen accused the film and television industry in the United Kingdom of racism and a lack of racial diversity. He wrote an op-ed for The Guardian about the "blatant racism" of the British film industry, saying: "I visited a TV-film set in London. It felt like I had walked out of one environment, the London I was surrounded by, into another, a place that was alien to me. I could not believe the whiteness of the set." He said there were not enough opportunities for black actors in the UK film industry.

In October 2020, he said he experienced racism "every day". He expressed support for the George Floyd protests.

== Filmography ==
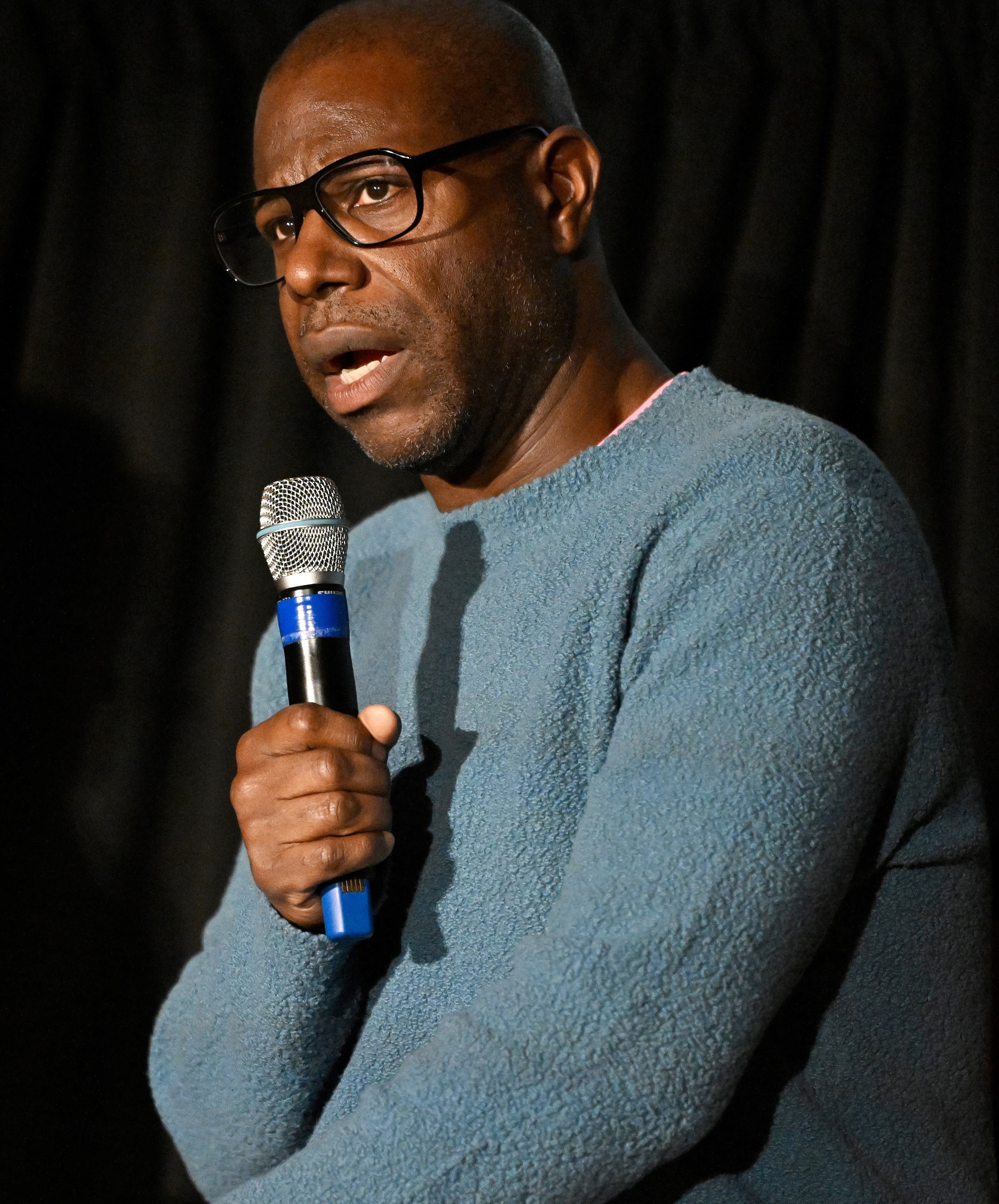
McQueen at the Middleburg Film Festival in 2024

=== Short films ===
- Bear (1993)
- Five Easy Pieces (1995)
- Just Above My Head (1996)
- Stage (1996)
- Exodus (1997)
- Deadpan (1997)
- Girls, Tricky (2001)
- Illuminer (2002)
- Western Deep (2002)
- Charlotte (2004)
- Gravesend (2007)
- Giardini (2009)
- Static (2009)
- Ashes (2015)
- Grenfell (2023)

=== Feature films ===
Year	Title	Director	Writer	Producer
2008	Hunger	Yes	Yes	No
2011	Shame	Yes	Yes	No
2013	12 Years a Slave	Yes	No	Yes
2018	Widows	Yes	Yes	Yes
2024	Blitz	Yes	Yes	Yes

Documentary films

Year	Title	Director	Writer	Producer
2023	Occupied City	Yes	No	Yes

=== Television ===
Year	Title	Director	Producer	Writer	Notes
2020	Small Axe	Yes	Yes	Yes	Anthology series of five films
2021	Uprising	Yes	Yes	No	Documentary series

== Awards and honours ==
For 12 Years a Slave, McQueen won the Academy Award for Best Picture, the BAFTA Award for Best Film, and the Golden Globe Award for Best Motion Picture – Drama. McQueen is the first black filmmaker to win the Academy Award for Best Picture. He is also the first person to win both an Academy Award and the Turner Prize. McQueen was awarded the Award for Cinematic Production by the Royal Photographic Society and the Cologne Film Prize in honour of his life's work.

McQueen was knighted by Queen Elizabeth II in the 2020 New Year Honours, before receiving his knighthood at Windsor Castle in March 2022. In 2024, he was awarded the Rolf Schock Prize. In October 2024, he was awarded an honorary doctorate from the University of Amsterdam together with his spouse Bianca Stigter for bringing "major social issues and political and historical themes to the attention of a large audience". In 2026, McQueen was awarded the Erasmus Prize.

He was appointed Officer of the Order of the British Empire (OBE) in the 2002 Birthday Honours, Commander of the Order of the British Empire (CBE) in the 2011 New Year Honours for services to the visual arts, and was knighted in 2020 for services to film. McQueen has been twice listed in the Powerlist Top 10 of the most influential Black Britons.

== Collections ==
McQueen's work is held in several public collections including:

- Whitworth, Manchester (supported by Art Fund)
- Imperial War Museum, UK (supported by Art Fund)

== Works cited ==
- Brockington, Horace. "Logical Anonymity: Lorna Simpson, Steve McQueen, Stan Douglas". International Review of African American Art 15, no. 3 (1998): 20–29.
- Demos, T. J. "Giardini: A Fairytale". In Steve McQueen (British Pavilion, Venice Biennale, 2009).
- Demos, T. J. "Moving Image of Globalization [On Steve McQueen's Gravesend]" and "Indeterminacy and Bare Life in Steve McQueen's Western Deep". The Migrant Image: The Art and Politics of Documentary During Global Crisis (Durham: Duke University Press, 2013), 21–32 and 33–54.
- Downey, Anthony. "Steve McQueen: Western Deep and Carib's Leap". Wasafiri, no. 37 (Winter 2002): 17–20.
- Downey, Anthony. "Steve McQueen: 'Once Upon a Time'". Journal of Visual Culture, vol. 5, no. 1 (2006), pp. 119–125.
