= Grenfell (film) =

2023 short film directed by Steve McQueen

Grenfell is an art film by Steve McQueen. It depicts the remains of the Grenfell Tower as shot from a helicopter in the aftermath of the fire at the tower in 2017. It was shown at the Serpentine Galleries in London's Hyde Park in 2023.

== Description ==
The film starts with shots over woodlands and fields before flying over the interwar housing of North West London towards the skyline of central London. The noise of birdsong, wind and cars and emergency sirens can be heard. The Grenfell Tower appears on the horizon and the soundtrack is replaced by silence. The camera continuously revolves around the tower. Reviewing the film in The Guardian, Robert Booth wrote that "Scraps of the cladding panels that burned like petrol are visible. Beams of sunlight hit the internal floors. In one flat sits a bathtub. Stacked in many flats are pink sacks filled with unidentified material. Absolute destruction fills the frame". Forensic investigators can be seen inside the rooms of the tower.

The film is 24 minutes in duration and has no words or music. It was filmed from a series of helicopter flights in December 2017 and depicts the burnt Grenfell Tower apartment block in West London following the fire at the tower in June 2017.

McQueen said that he wanted to " ... put the building in perspective of our everyday [life] ... It's not isolated. That is important because you [the viewer] put it in the perspective of yourself" and that it was about suspending the tower "in time" and " ... looking. Holding, holding, holding".

== Production ==
McQueen directed the film in a single shot. He felt that it could not be shown "within three or four years" of the fire. He felt that creating the film was a "race against time" as "Once things are covered up, they are forgotten about, or it can be more convenient for people who want it to be forgotten about". He was motivated to create the film after hearing that the site was due to be wrapped in plastic by officials.

McQueen engaged with local community groups including Grenfell United and did a leaflet drop to inform people of his proposal. He encountered resistance to the project but continued to engage with residents. In an interview with The Guardian McQueen cited the decision of Mamie Till, the mother of Emmett Till who was abducted, tortured and lynched in a racially motivated attack in Mississippi in 1955 to show her son's body in an open casket as "everybody needed to know what had happened".

== Reception ==
The film was shown at the Serpentine Galleries in London's Hyde Park from 7 April to 10 May 2023. Survivors of the fire and those bereaved were invited to private screenings.

McQueen said in an interview with The Guardian that "You must understand that the violence that was inflicted on that community was no joke ... I didn't want to let people off the hook. There are going to be people who are going to be a little bit disturbed. When you make art, anything half decent ... there are certain people you will possibly offend. But that is how it is".
