= Margareta Niculescu =

Romanian theatre director and puppeteer

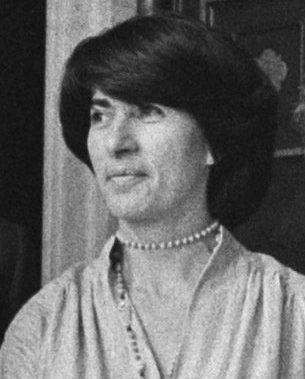
Erasmus Prize 1978, Niculescu

Margareta Niculescu (4 January 1926 – 19 August 2018) was a Romanian artist, puppeteer, director, teacher and theater director. She contributed to the renewal, since the 1950s, of the art of puppetry in Europe and the rest of the world. She was director of the Țăndărică Theatre in Bucharest. From 2000 until 2004 she was president of the International Puppetry Association in Charleville-Mezieres, in Ardennes, and co-founded with Jacques Felix, the National School of Puppetry Arts in that city. In 1978 she won the Erasmus Prize together with other noted puppeteers Yves Joly, Peter Schumann, and the Napoli brothers.

== Biography ==
Born in Iași, Kingdom of Romania, Niculescu discovered a puppetry troupe that considered its art theatrical and directed accordingly its projects. The puppet theater at that time was neither structured nor professionalized in Romania; instead small groups of artists drew their characters from folk tradition.

At the same era, the Romanian Communist Party took power and abolished the monarchy, proclaiming the People's Republic of Romania on December 30, 1947. The Party then created a new network of cultural institutions controlled by the state. As part of this effort, Niculescu was invited by the Romanian Ministry of Culture to help bring puppetry to a new level as national theater. In this new field Niculescu began studies at the Institute of Theatre and Film Arts (IATC), and then became director at the Țăndărică Theater of Bucharest. At that time she was 23 years old and remained in this position from 1949 to 1986. As director, she received the Erasmus Prize on behalf of the group in 1978, when it was recognized for being "a colourful and imaginative theatre that has had a fertile influence on post-war puppetry".

In 1985–1986, after 37 years as head of the Țăndărică Theater, Niculescu (with Jacques Felix) launched the International Institute of Puppetry in Ardennes. Three years later, again with Felix, she founded the National School of Puppetry in Charleville Mezieres, and then served as its director from 1987 to 1998.

Niculescu died on 19 August 2018 in Charleville-Mézières, France at the age of 92.

== Works ==
- Světové loutkářství : současné loutkové divadlo slovem i obrazem, 1966, in Czech.
- The puppet theatre of the modern world; an international presentation in word and picture, UNIMA, 1967, English and German.
- Puppentheater der Welt; zeitgenössisches Puppenspiel in Wort und Bild, UNIMA, 22 reprints 1965 – 1968 in Germany.
- Marionnettes du monde entier : théâtres de marionnettes contemporains, UNIMA, 1967, French.
- L'avant-garde et la marionnette, 1988, French.
- Die Avantgarde und das Figurentheater, 1993, in German.
- Marionnettes en territoire brésilien, Festival mondial des théâtres de marionnettes, 1994, in French.
- Passeurs et complices (Passing it on), Institut international de la marionnette, in French and English, 2009.
