= Yves Joly =

French puppeteer

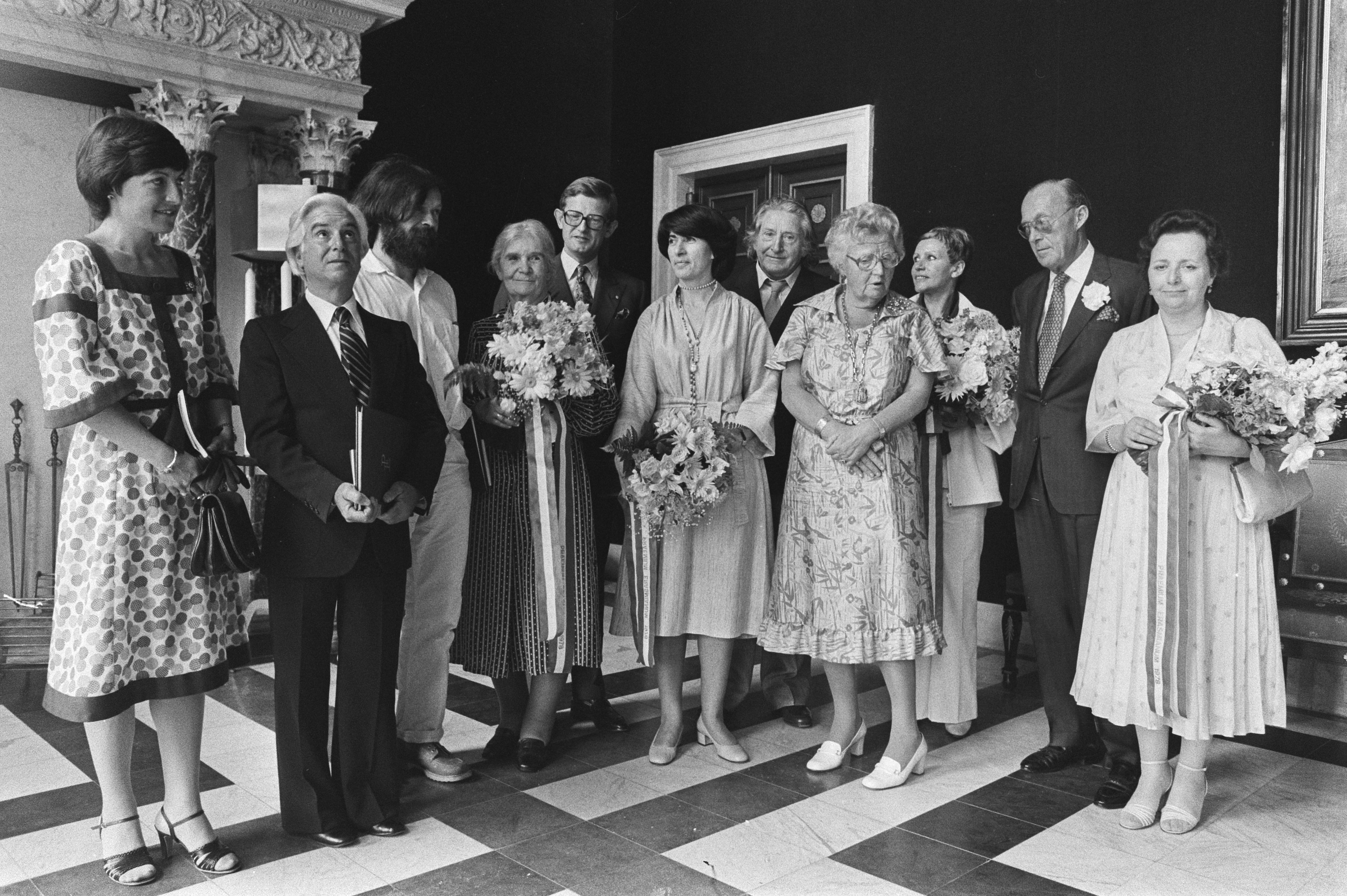
Joly receiving the Erasmus Prize in 1978

Yves Joly (October 11, 1908 – May 24, 2013) was a French puppeteer. Joly is recognized as an innovator in puppeteering, pioneering shows that used minimal paper marionettes, or hands alone. Joly received the Erasmus Prize in 1978 (along with Margareta Niculescu and Peter Schumann) for "reducing the puppet theatre to its simplest form".
