= Praemium Erasmianum Foundation =

Dutch cultural institution

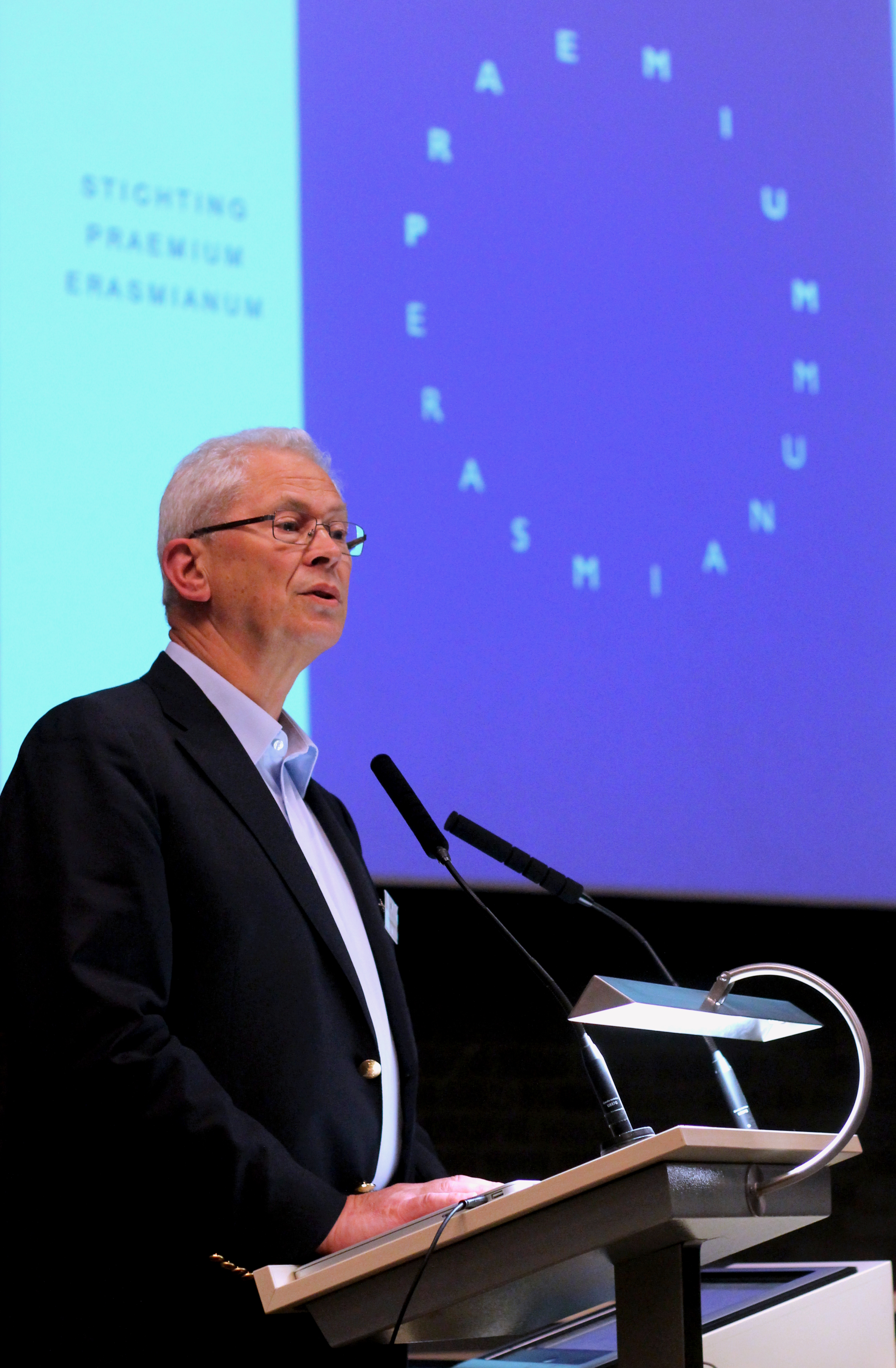
- Former director Max Sparreboom announcing the 2015 Erasmus Prize
- Formation: 1958
- Founder: HRH Prince Bernhard of the Netherlands
- Location: Amsterdam, Netherlands
- Key people: Patron: Willem-Alexander of the Netherlands; Chairman: Ernst Hirsch Ballin
- Website: www.erasmusprijs.org

The Praemium Erasmianum Foundation is a Dutch cultural institution that works in the humanities, the social science and the arts. It was founded in 1958 by Prince Bernhard of Lippe-Biesterfeld. The aim of the Foundation is to strengthen the position of the arts, the social sciences and the humanities. The Foundation is motivated by the ideas of Desiderius Erasmus, from whom it derives its name, and European cultural traditions. Humanistic values, such as tolerance, cultural pluralism and critical thinking, are reflected in the choice of the Erasmus Prize laureates and in the activities around the theme of the Prize.

== Governance ==
The Foundation's patron is King Willem-Alexander of the Netherlands. It is governed by a board with members representing the cultural, scholarly and business communities in the Netherlands. As of 2023 the Board consists of Xandra Schutte (Chair), Sven Arne Tepl (Vice-Chair), Peter Blom (Treasurer), Maarten Asscher, Barnita Bagchi, Andreas Blühm, Antoine Buyse, Mieke Gerritzen, Judi Mesman, Jos de Mul and Nazmiye Oral. As of 2015 the organisation has three staff members, and the director is Shanti van Dam. Funding for the Foundation originally came from the Dutch National Postcode Lottery and the Sport Totaliser, although it is now financially independent.

== Prizes ==
The Foundation awards the Erasmus Prize, which is an annual prize that is awarded to individuals or institutions who have made exceptional contributions to culture, society, or social science in Europe and the rest of the world. The Foundation organizes a wide range of academic and cultural activities around the Erasmus Prize award ceremony, as well as an essay or publications based on the laureate and their work. The Foundation has also awarded annual Research Prizes since 1988. As of 2015 it awards up to five prizes of €3,000 each to PhD graduates who have written an outstanding thesis in the humanities and social sciences. The prizes are awarded by the Foundation's director at a ceremony that normally takes place in May.
