= Erasmus Prize =

Annual award

- Awarded for: Notable contributions to European culture, society, or social science
- Country: Netherlands
- Reward: €150,000
- First award: 1958
- Final award: Annual award
- Website: http://www.erasmusprijs.org/

The Erasmus Prize is an annual prize awarded by the board of the Praemium Erasmianum Foundation to individuals or institutions that have made exceptional contributions to culture, society, or social science in Europe and the rest of the world. It is one of Europe's most distinguished recognitions. The prize is named after Desiderius Erasmus, the Dutch Renaissance humanist.

== Prize and adornment ==
As of 2024, the prize consists of €150,000 and an adornment that was designed by Bruno Ninaber van Eyben in 1995. The adornment is a ribbon folded in the style of a harmonica, with ends made of titanium plates. The ribbon bears a text in the handwriting of Erasmus taken from a letter to Jean Carondelet written on 5 January 1523. The text reads "variae sunt ingeniorum dotes multae seculorum varietates sunt. quod quisque potest in medium proferat nec alteri quisquam invideat qui pro sua virili suoque modo conatur publicis studiis utilitatis aliquid adiungere.", which translates as "Diverse are the gifts of men of genius and many are the different kinds of ages. Let each one reveal the scope of his competence and let no one be envious of another who in keeping with his own ability and style tries to make a useful contribution to the education of all."

== Ceremony ==
The award ceremony typically takes place at the Royal Palace of Amsterdam, where the prize is presented by the patron of the Foundation (His Majesty the King Willem-Alexander of the Netherlands as of 2015). A wide range of academic and cultural activities are organised around the Erasmus Prize award ceremony, in cooperation with other academic and cultural organisations. These have included lectures, conferences, workshops, exhibitions, performances of dance, music and theatre, and other educational activities. An essay on the topic of the laureate and their work is also published.

The prize was first awarded in 1958. As of 2015 it has been awarded a total of 73 times in 53 years. The area in which the Erasmus prize will be awarded is decided upon in advance by the Foundation's board. An advisory committee then consults with Dutch and foreign experts before proposing a laureate; the final choice of the laureate is then made by the Foundation's board. In 2015, Wikipedia editors received the Erasmus Prize—under the theme 'Digital Culture'. According to the Foundation, Wikipedia: "has promoted the dissemination of knowledge through a comprehensive and universally acceptable encyclopedia available to everybody". Three young representatives of the Wikipedia Community received the Erasmus Prize, each of them represented new initiatives within Wikipedia.

== Young researchers ==
The Erasmus prize is not intended to stimulate young researchers. However, the Praemium Erasmianum Foundation has awarded from 1988 yearly "Research Prizes" for exceptionally high quality PhD studies on the field of Law, Humanities, Social sciences.

== Prize winners ==
Photo	Year	Winner	Notes
	1958	The People of Austria	Cultural heritage. Awarded at the University of Milan. Prize funds were granted to Austrians studying in Europe; foreign students studying in Austria; and excavations at Ephesus.
	1959	Robert Schuman	
	1959	Karl Jaspers	
	1960	Marc Chagall	
	1960	Oskar Kokoschka	
	1962	Romano Guardini	
	1963	Martin Buber	
	1964	Union Académique Internationale	
	1965	Charlie Chaplin, Ingmar Bergman	
	1966	Herbert Read, René Huyghe	
	1967	Jan Tinbergen	
	1968	Henry Moore	
	1969	Gabriel Marcel, Carl Friedrich von Weizsäcker	
	1970	Hans Scharoun	
	1971	Olivier Messiaen	
	1972	Jean Piaget	
	1973	Claude Lévi-Strauss	
	1974	Ninette de Valois, Maurice Béjart	
	1975	Ernst Gombrich, Willem Sandberg	
	1976	Amnesty International, René David	
	1977	Werner Kaegi, Jean Monnet	
	1978	Puppet Theatre/Theme puppetry: La Marionettistica of the Napoli brothers; Ţăndărică of Margareta Niculescu; Théâtre de papier of Yves Joly; Bread and Puppet of Peter Schumann	
	1979	Die Zeit, Neue Zürcher Zeitung	
	1980	Nikolaus Harnoncourt, Gustav Leonhardt	
	1981	Jean Prouvé	
	1982	Edward Schillebeeckx	
	1983	Raymond Aron, Isaiah Berlin, Leszek Kołakowski, Marguerite Yourcenar	
	1984	Massimo Pallottino	
	1985	Paul Delouvrier	
	1986	Václav Havel	
	1987	Alexander King	
	1988	Jacques Ledoux	
	1989	International Commission of Jurists	
	1990	Grahame Clark	
	1991	Bernard Haitink	
	1992	General Archive of the Indies	
	1992	Simon Wiesenthal	
	1993	Peter Stein	
	1994	Sigmar Polke	
	1995	Renzo Piano	
	1996	William Hardy McNeill	
	1997	Jacques Delors	
	1998	Mauricio Kagel, Peter Sellars	
	1999	Mary Robinson	
	2000	Hans van Manen	
	2001	Claudio Magris, Adam Michnik	
	2002	Bernd and Hilla Becher	
	2003	Alan Davidson	
	2004	Abdolkarim Soroush, Sadik Al-Azm and Fatema Mernissi	
	2005	Simon Schaffer and Steven Shapin	
	2006	Pierre Bernard	
	2007	Péter Forgács	
	2008	Ian Buruma	
	2009	Antonio Cassese, Benjamin B. Ferencz	
	2010	José Antonio Abreu	
	2011	Joan Busquets	
	2012	Daniel Dennett	
	2013	Jürgen Habermas	
	2014	Frie Leysen	Theme of "Theatre, audience and society"
	2015	Wikipedia community	For "[promoting] the dissemination of knowledge through a comprehensive and universally accessible encyclopaedia. To achieve that, the initiators of Wikipedia have designed a new and effective democratic platform. The prize specifically recognises Wikipedia as a community—a shared project that involves tens of thousands of volunteers around the world."
	2016	A. S. Byatt	For inspiring contribution to 'life writing'
	2017	Michèle Lamont	"For her devoted contribution to social science research into the relationship between knowledge, power and diversity"
	2018	Barbara Ehrenreich	For giving "a voice to groups in society that would otherwise remain unheard"
	2019	John Adams	"Because he has created a new musical idiom by fusing elements from jazz, pop and classical music"
	2021	Grayson Perry	"Perry has developed a unique visual language, demonstrating that art belongs to everybody and should not be an elitist affair."
	2022	David Grossman	"He seeks to understand people from within, and to regard the other with love, across borders of war and history."
	2023	Trevor Noah	"... for his inspired contribution to the theme 'In Praise of Folly,' named after Erasmus’s most famous book, which is filled with humour, social criticism and political satire. With his sharp-minded, mocking yet inclusive political comedy, Noah, in the eyes of the jury, upholds the 'Erasmian Spirit.'"
	2024	Amitav Ghosh	"He receives the prize for his passionate contribution to the theme ‘imagining the unthinkable’, in which an unprecedented global crisis – climate change – takes shape through the written word. Ghosh has delved deeply into the question of how to do justice to this existential threat that defies our imagination. His work offers a remedy by making an uncertain future palpable through compelling stories about the past. He also wields his pen to show that the climate crisis is a cultural crisis that results from a dearth of the imagination."
	2025	Donna Haraway	"The theme of this year’s prize is “the pursuit of what binds us.” Haraway is an altruistic thinker who explores the many interconnections between biology, literature, art, and social and political engagement. Like Erasmus in The Praise of Folly, she challenges human thought patterns and behaviors that go against humanistic ideals like equality and openness. What sets Haraway apart is that she extends her thinking beyond humans to include all living beings."
	2026	Steve McQueen	

== See also ==
- List of awards for contributions to culture
- List of awards for contributions to society
